= Dunedin City Council =

Local Council in New Zealand

Dunedin City Council Kaunihera ā-Rohe o Ōtepoti
- Coat of arms

- Brand logo

Type
- Type: Territorial authority of Dunedin
- Term limits: None

History
- Established: 1 November 1989; 36 years ago
- Preceded by: Dunedin City Council
- New session started: 17 October 2025

Leadership
- Mayor: Sophie Barker, Ind. since 17 October 2025
- Deputy: Cherry Lucas, Ind. since 31 October 2025
- CEO: Sandy Graham since 12 October 2020

Structure
- Seats: 15 (including mayor)
- Political groups: Independent (11); Labour (1); Green (1); Future Dunedin (1); Building Kotahitaka (1)

Elections
- Voting system: Single Transferable Vote
- First election: 14 October 1989
- Last election: 11 October 2025
- Next election: 14 October 2028

Motto
- Maiorum Institutis Utendo

Meeting place
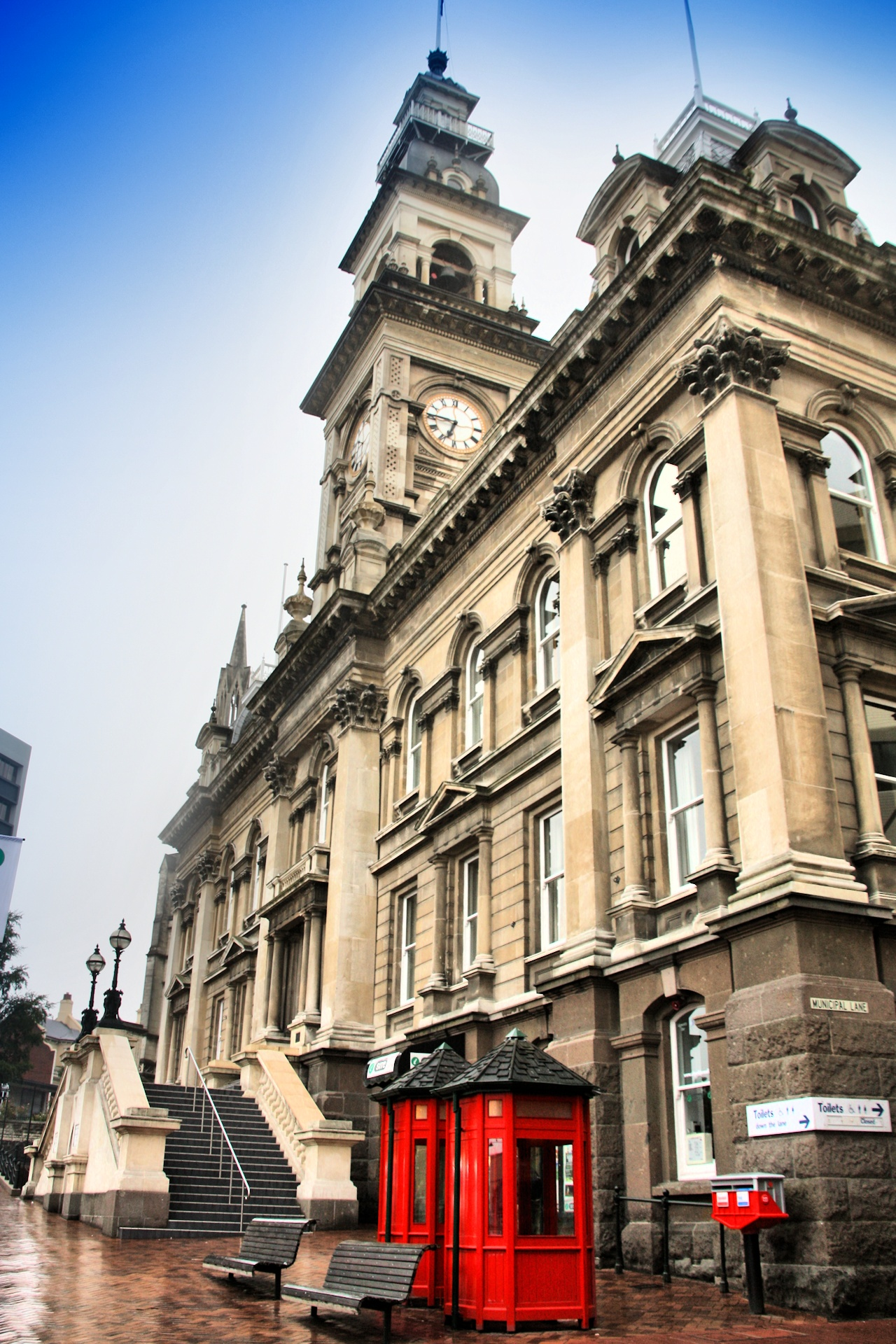
- Dunedin Town Hall, The Octagon

Website
- dunedin.govt.nz

Dunedin City Council (abbr. DCC; Māori: Kaunihera ā-Rohe o Ōtepoti) is the territorial authority for the city of Dunedin, New Zealand, and its surrounding area, including the towns of Mosgiel, Brighton and Waikouaiti. It serves as the area's local government alongside the Otago Regional Council as the regional council. It was established in 1989, replacing a borough council of the same name that had existed since 1877.

The governing body of the council has 14 councillors and is chaired by the mayor of Dunedin (currently Sophie Barker since October 2025). There are also six community boards.

== History ==
=== Predecessors ===
The original Dunedin City Council existed from 1877 to 1989.

== Governing body ==
=== Mayor ===
One mayor is elected at large. They chair meetings of council and act as the elected head of local government.

=== Current composition ===
The current members of the governing body of council are:

Role	Portrait	Name	Affiliation
Mayor		Sophie Barker	Independent
Deputy mayor		Cherry Lucas	Independent
Councillor		Andrew Simms	Future Dunedin
Councillor		Lee Vandervis	Independent
Councillor		Jo Galer	Independent
Councillor		Marie Laufiso	Building Kotahitaka
Councillor		John Chambers	Your Health Candidate
Councillor		Russell Lund	Independent
Councillor		Brent Weatherall	Independent
Councillor		Steve Walker	Labour
Councillor		Mickey Treadwell	Green
Councillor		Mandy Mayhem	Independent
Councillor		Benedict Ong	Independent
Councillor		Christine Garey	Independent
Councillor		Doug Hall	Independent

=== List of members by term ===
Term		Mayor	Councillors	Ref.
1st	1989–1992	Richard Walls		
2nd	1992–1995	Richard Walls		
3rd	1995–1998	Sukhi Turner		
4th	1998–2001	Sukhi Turner		
5th	2001–2004	Sukhi Turner		
6th	2004–2007	Peter Chin		
7th	2007–2010	Peter Chin		
8th	2010–2013	Dave Cull	Bill Acklin; John Bezett; Fliss Butcher; Syd Brown; Neil Collins; Paul Hudson; Jinty MacTavish; Andrew Noone; Chris Staynes; Teresa Stevenson; Richard Thompson; Lee Vandervis; Colin Weatherall; Kate Wilson	
9th	2013–2016	Dave Cull	David Benson-Pope; John Bezett; Hilary Calvert; Doug Hall; Aaron Hawkins (G); Mike Lord; Jinty MacTavish (GD); Andrew Noone; Neville Peat; Chris Staynes (GD); Richard Thompson (GD); Lee Vandervis; Andrew Whiley; Kate Wilson	
9th	2016–2019	Dave Cull	David Benson-Pope; Rachel Elder; Christine Garey; Doug Hall; Aaron Hawkins (G); Marie Laufiso (G); Mike Lord; Jim O'Malley; Damian Newell; Chris Staynes; Conrad Stedman; Lee Vandervis; Andrew Whiley; Kate Wilson	
10th	2019–2022	Aaron Hawkins (Green)	Sophie Barker; David Benson-Pope; Rachel Elder; Christine Garey; Doug Hall; Carmen Houlahan; Marie Laufiso; Mike Lord; Jim O'Malley; Jules Radich; Chris Staynes; Lee Vandervis; Steve Walker (L); Andrew Whiley	
11th	2022–2025	Jules Radich (Team Dunedin)	Bill Acklin; Sophie Barker; David Benson-Pope; Christine Garey; Kevin Gilbert (TD); Carmen Houlahan; Marie Laufiso; Cherry Lucas; Mandy Mayhem; Jim O'Malley; Lee Vandervis; Steve Walker (L); Brent Weatherall (TD); Andrew Whiley (TD)	
12th	2025–2028	Sophie Barker	John Chambers; Jo Galer; Christine Garey; Doug Hall; Marie Laufiso (BK); Cherry Lucas; Russell Lund; Mandy Mayhem; Benedict Ong; Andrew Simms (FD); Mickey Treadwell (G); Lee Vandervis; Steve Walker (L); Brent Weatherall	

== Elections ==
Elections for the councillors for the 2025–2028 term were held in October 2025. Councillor Jules Radich died on 4 January 2026, triggering a by-election held in May 2026. The by-election was won by independent candidate Jo Galer.

=== List ===
==== Council ====
- 1989
- 1992
- 1995
- 1998
- 2001
- 2004
- 2007
- 2010
- 2013
- 2016
- 2019
- 2022
- 2025

==== Mayoral ====
- 1989
- 1992
- 1995
- 1998
- 2001
- 2004
- 2007
- 2010
- 2013
- 2016
- 2019
- 2022
- 2025

== Community boards ==
The council has created six local community boards under the provisions of Part 4 of the Local Government Act 2002, each with six elected members and one councillor appointed by the council:

- Strath Taieri Community Board
- Waikouaiti Coast Community Board
- Mosgiel-Taieri Community Board
- Saddle Hill Community Board
- West Harbour Community Board, and
- Otago Peninsula Community Board.

These community boards are intended to provide advice to the city council regarding the interests of the communities they represent.

== Coat of arms and flag ==
Coat of arms of Dunedin City Council
Notes The city's coat of arms, which were granted in 1947 by the Lord Lyon King of Arms, are emblazoned as: Coronet A Mural Crown. Escutcheon Argent above a Fess Dancette Vert, a Castle Triple-Towered sable on a Rock issuing from the Fess, Masoned Argent, with Windows, Vanes and Portcullis Gules. In the base a Three-Masted Lymphad with Sail Furled Azure, Flagged of Scotland, a Ram's Head Affrontee Horned Or between Two Garbs of the last. Supporters On the Dexter a Scotsman Habited with Philabeg and Plaid of the Clan Cameron, supporting in His Exterior Hand a Cromach; on the Sinister a Māori Chief attired in Korowai, Two Huia Feathers in his hair, an Aurei and a Hei Matau and in His Exterior hand a Taiaha. All Proper. Motto Maiorum Institutis Utendo (By following in the steps of our forefathers) Symbolism The castle is taken from the arms of Edinburgh, while the green fess and garb/animals signify regional agriculture and crops. At the base, the lymphad, or ship, alludes to the arrival of Scottish immigrants to the Otago region. The supporters represent the original Māori owners of the land and its Scottish purchasers. All of the elements of the arms are crowned with a mural crown, emblematic of local government. Their motto is: Maiorum Institutis Utendo, or in English, By following in the steps of our forefathers.

The flag of the city of Dunedin is a banner of arms in white and green and featuring the castle, lymphad, ram's head and wheat sheafs as on the coat of arms.
