= 2013 Dunedin mayoral election =

New Zealand mayoral election

- 12 October 2013
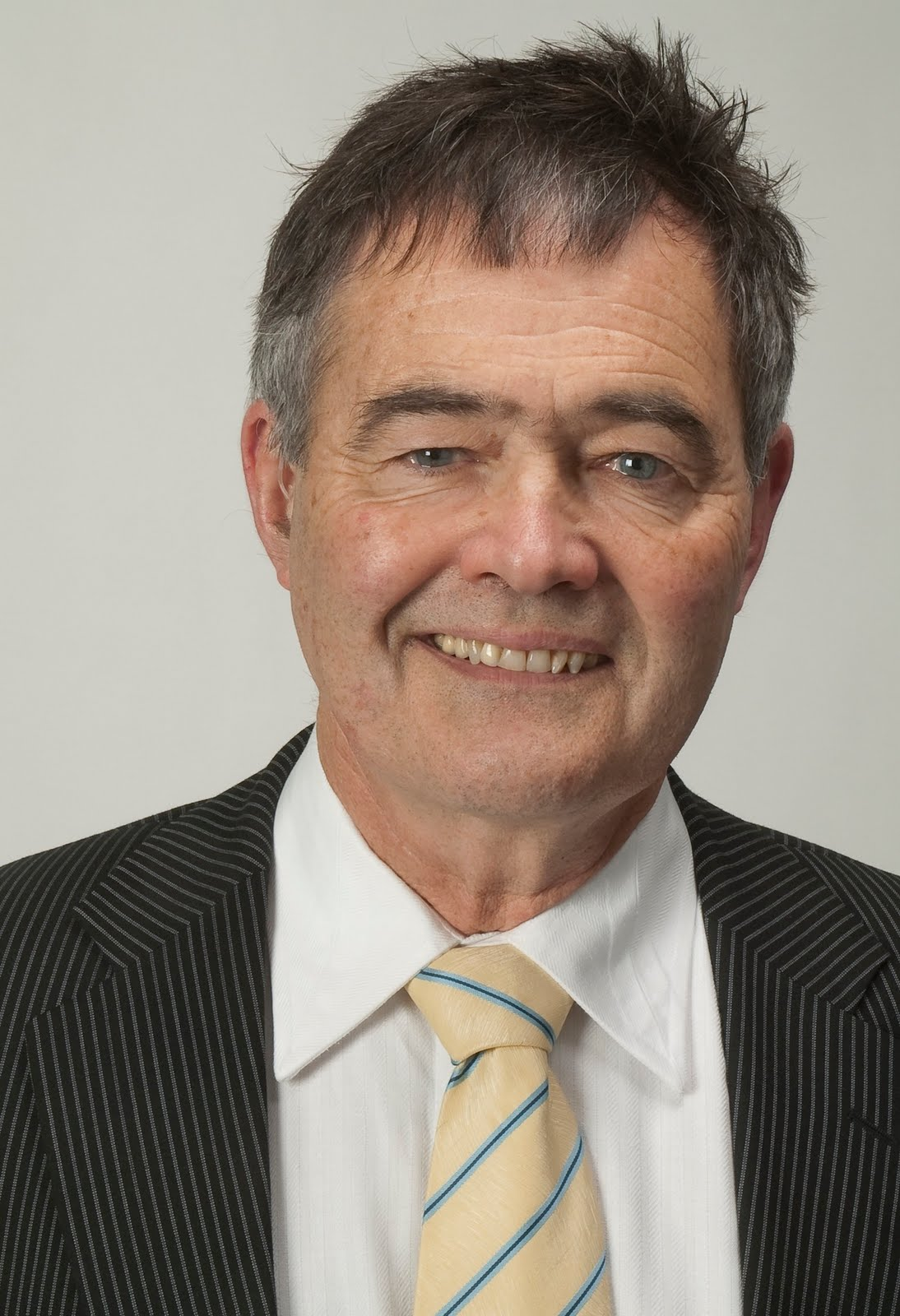

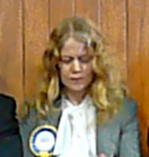

Candidate	Dave Cull	Hilary Calvert	Lee Vandervis
Party	Greater Dunedin	Independent	Independent
Popular vote	18,604	6,474	5,872
Percentage	50.4	17.6	16.0
Mayor before election
Dave Cull
Elected mayor
Dave Cull

The 2013 Dunedin mayoral election was held on Saturday, 12 October 2013 and was conducted under the single transferable voting system. Dave Cull, Dunedin's 57th mayor, was re-elected after seeing off eight challengers.

== Candidates ==
First-term incumbent Dave Cull was the first to enter the contest, announcing his candidature in January 2013. He faced eight challengers, including one sitting councillor and one former Member of Parliament.

Councillor Lee Vandervis, who placed third in the previous local body elections, announced on 21 May that he would contest his fourth mayoralty; he had stood in every mayoral election since 2004. Aside from Cull, Vandervis was the only current councillor seeking the mayoralty.

For the first time, the Green Party stood a candidate for the Dunedin mayoralty. Although former mayor Sukhi Turner was a member of the Green Party, she did not run for mayor on the party ticket. Broadcaster Aaron Hawkins was confirmed by the Green Party on 24 May as their candidate. Hawkins contested the 2010 mayoralty as an independent, when he came fourth.

Former ACT Member of Parliament Hilary Calvert declared her candidacy, as an independent. She also contested a seat on the City Council. Former United Future candidate and blogger Pete George also declared an independent bid for the mayoralty.

The other mayoral candidates were two 2010 mayoral hopefuls Olivier Lequeux and Kevin Dwyer, as well as Steve McGregor and Andrew Whiley.

== Results ==
Cull was re-elected, beating Calvert and Vandervis to second and third place. Both Calvert and Vandervis were elected to Council, as were fourth-placed Aaron Hawkins and fifth-placed Andrew Whiley.

Candidate	Affiliation	First Preference			Last Iteration	
Candidate	Affiliation	Votes	%	+/-	Votes	%
Dave Cull	Greater Dunedin	18,335	49.3	+0.7	18,604	50.4
Hilary Calvert		6,191	16.7		6,474	17.6
Lee Vandervis		5,653	15.2	+2.0	5,872	16.0
Aaron Hawkins	Green Dunedin	2,787	7.5	+4.1	2,972	8.1
Andrew Whiley	Independent	2,674	7.2		2,962	8.0
Pete George	Your Dunedin	704	1.9			
Olivier Lequeux		487	1.3	-1.3		
Kevin Dwyer		206	0.6	+0.2		
Steve McGregor		179	0.5			
Informal votes		89				
Turnout		37,216				

== See also ==
- 2013 New Zealand local elections
- 2016 Dunedin mayoral election
