= Dalmore Reserve =

Reserve and community garden in Dunedin, New Zealand

Coordinates: 45°50′59″S 170°31′05″E

Dalmore Reserve is a small reserve in the suburb of Dalmore in Dunedin. It is managed by Dunedin City Council who purchased the land in 1990 from the Dominican Order. The 6-hectare reserve is primarily lowland native forest and features a community garden and walking tracks.

== History ==
In October 2016, local residents established a community garden. It was officially opened by Mayor Dave Cull and Councillor Jinty MacTavish.

== Flora and fauna ==
The reserve is predominantly lowland native forest and is classified as an Urban Biodiversity Mapped Area in Dunedin City Council's Second Generation District Plan.
