= 2001 Dunedin mayoral election =

New Zealand mayoral election

- 13 October 2001
- Turnout: 47,131
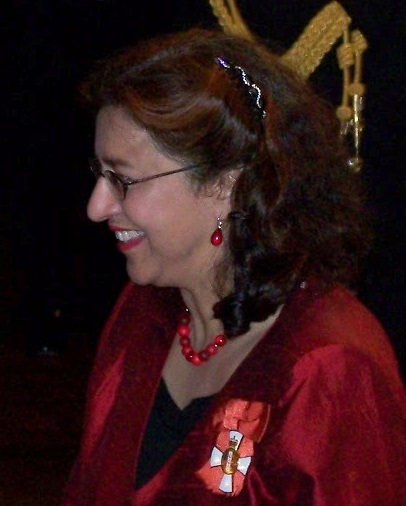

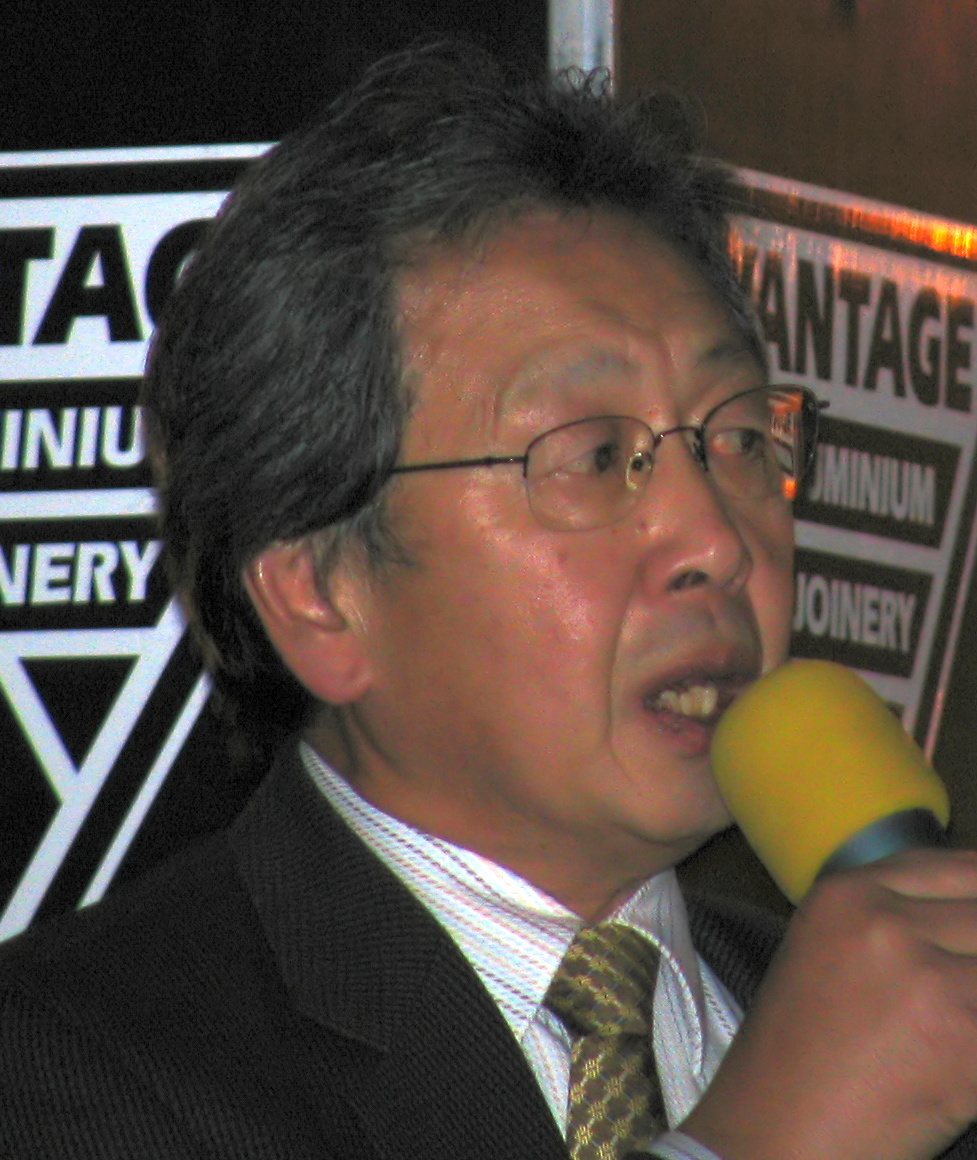

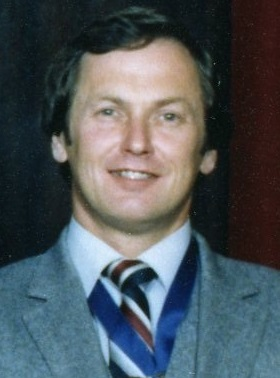
Candidate	Sukhi Turner	Peter Chin	Richard Walls
Party	Green	Independent	Independent
Popular vote	15,972	14,578	9,533
Percentage	33.88	30.93	20.22
Mayor before election
Sukhi Turner
Elected mayor
Sukhi Turner

The 2001 Dunedin mayoral election re-elected Sukhi Turner as Mayor of Dunedin for a third term. This was the last Dunedin mayoral election that used the First past the post method.

== Results ==
The following table shows the results for the election:

2001 Dunedin mayoral election
Party	Candidate	Votes	%	±%
Green	Sukhi Turner	15,972	33.88	−9.62
Independent	Peter Chin	14,578	30.93	
Independent	Richard Walls	9,533	20.22	
Independent	Jeremy Belcher	3,857	8.18	
Independent	Neale McMillan	2,197	4.66	
Independent	Alex Fergus	457	0.96	
Independent	Desmond Boyes	151	0.32	
Informal votes		386	0.81	−0.46
Majority		1,394	2.95	−4.10
Turnout		47,131		
