= 2026 Dunedin City Council by-election =

Local by-election in New Zealand

- 12 May 2026
- Turnout: 31,629 (33.31% ▼12.08 pp)
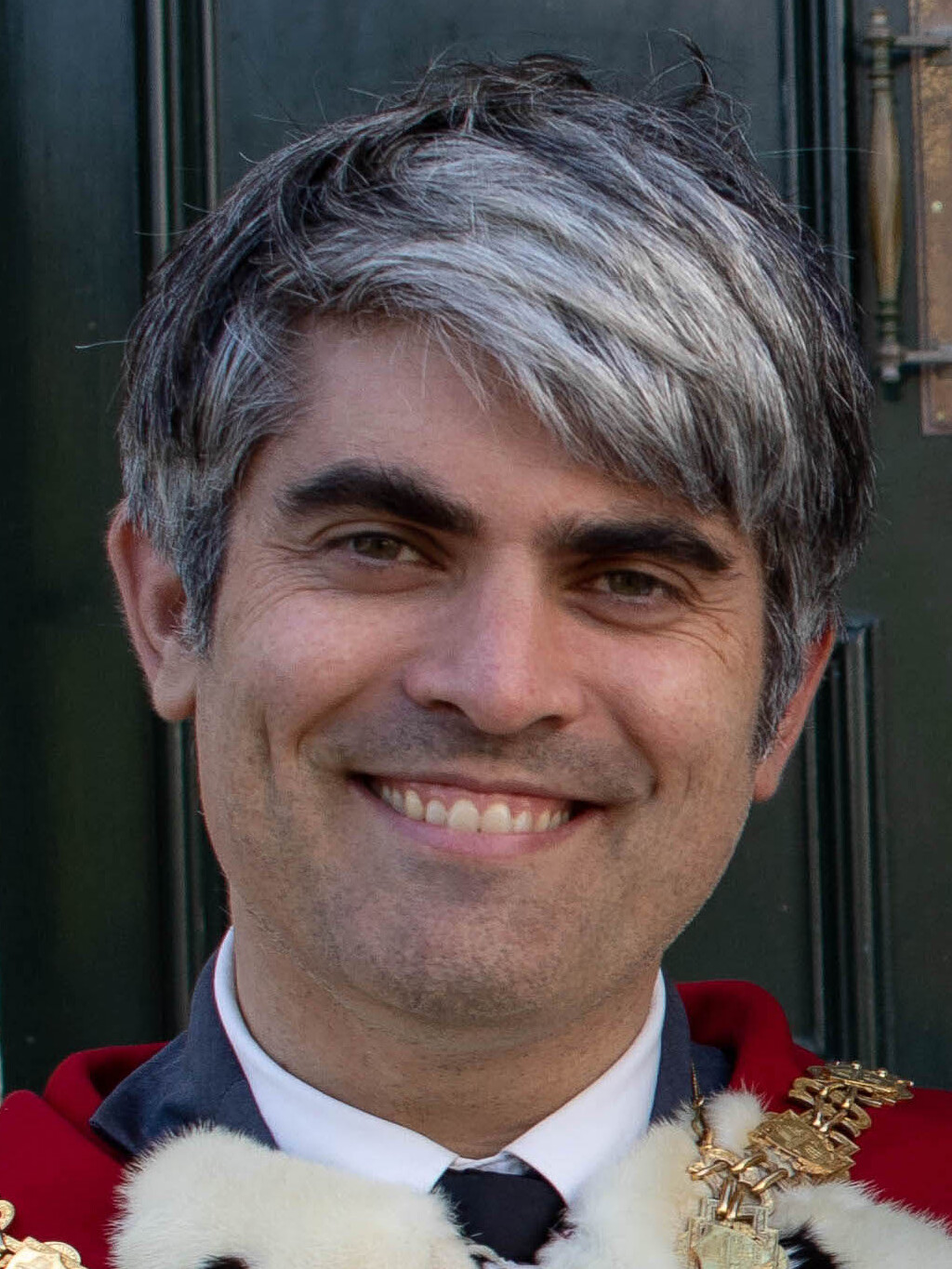
	Ind
Candidate	Jo Galer	Aaron Hawkins
Party	Independent	Independent
Primary vote	5,527	7,740
Percentage	17.47%	24.47%
Final vote	10,201	10,112
Percentage	50.22%	49.78%
Councillor before election
Jules Radich†
Independent
Elected Councillor
Jo Galer
Independent

The 2026 Dunedin City Council by-election was a local by-election held on 12 May 2026 in Dunedin, New Zealand, that was prompted by the death of councillor Jules Radich on 4 January 2026. Voters elected one member to the Dunedin City Council representing the city at-large. Postal voting and the single transferable vote system were used.

Jo Galer narrowly defeated former mayor Aaron Hawkins by just 89 votes. She will serve for the remainder of the 2025–2028 term.

== Schedule ==
Key dates related to the by-election are:

- 2 March 2026: Nominations close
- 10 April 2026: Voting opens
- 12 May 2026: Polling day – voting closes midday

== Background ==
Dunedin City boundaries with urban areas shown in orange

The by-election was triggered by the death of sitting Councillor and former Mayor of Dunedin Jules Radich from a heart attack on 4 January 2026.

=== Cost ===
The election is estimated to cost the council around $400,000, with costs dependent on factors including the number of candidates.

== Campaign ==
According to the Otago Daily Times, key issues for candidates were managing Dunedin City Council's rising rates and the general cost of living.

In late March 2026, Otago Institute for the Arts and Sciences president Dr Barbara Anderson interviewed 14 by-election candidates on the Institute's podcast on Otago Access Radio (OAR). 13 of these interviews were published on the radio station's website on 2 April. Candidate Jo Galer sought to re-record her answer to a question regarding the role of mana whenua (local Māori groups with customary authority and rights) in local governance within a Treaty of Waitangi context. Anderson initially declined to allow her to re-record the interview but relented due to Galer's insistence and after consulting with the radio station's manager. Following a dispute with Anderson over her alleged left-wing bias and threatening legal action against OAR, Galer withdrew her consent for the interview to be published.

The first public meeting for by-election candidates was held at St Peter's Church Hall in Caversham by the Dunedin Area Citizens Association on 15 April. The meeting featured nine candidates Conrad Stedman, Andrew Whiley, Carmen Houlahan, Garreth Ottley, Angus Mackay, Lync Aronson, Angela McErlane, Lianna MacFarlane and Jo Galer, and was attended by 40 members of the public. Topics covered during the public meeting included finance, transportation, infrastructure, Dunedin's debt, assets sales, the Smooth Hill landfill and wastewater solutions in Surrey Street.

A second public meeting was held at the University of Otago by the Otago University Students' Association on 16 April. This meeting featured four candidates Aaron Hawkins, Andrew Whiley, Bill Acklin and Richard Knights, and focused on university-City Council relations, transport infrastructure and landlords. Galer criticised the selection of the candidates as "limited." In response, the OUSA political representative Flynn Nisbett justified the smaller selection of candidates on the grounds that the candidate forum during the 2025 Dunedin City Council election provided "little insight" into candidates' plans.

A third public meeting was held at the Taieri Bowling Club in Mosgiel by the Dunedin Area Citizens Association on 16 April. The meeting featured Stedman, Whiley, Ottley, Mackay, Aronson, MacFarlane and Galer. Topics covered at this meeting included debt, a proposed heavy transport bypass for Mosgiel, and the proposed Smooth Hill landfill.

A candidates event organised by Business South took place at the Otago Museum on 5 May. The event was attended by ten candidates including Hawkins, Acklin, Knights, Whiley, Houlahan, Galer, MacFarlane, Mackay, Stedman and Aronson. It focused on the city's finances, leadership, community initiatives, growth opportunities and the Government's recent three-month deadline for local councils to present amalgamation plans.

== Candidates ==
Former mayor Aaron Hawkins announced his intention to stand in February as an independent candidate. Former city councillors Carmen Houlahan, Andrew Whiley, Bill Acklin and Conrad Stedman also stood. Other candidates included Jo Galer, Lync Aronson, Richard Knights, Pamela Taylor, Lianne MacFarlane and Garreth Ottley. The Green Party, Labour Party and ACT Party did not endorse a candidate in the election. Fourteen candidates registered by the nomination deadline of 2 March.

=== List ===
Candidates	Affiliation	Notes
Bill Acklin	Independent	Candidate in the 2025 election. Dunedin City Councillor 2004–2013 and 2022–2025
Lync Aronson	Independent	Candidate in the 2025 election
Gordon Dickson	None	
Jo Galer	Independent	Candidate in the 2025 election Campaigned on a platform of prioritising basic infrastructure, capping rates, and stopping cycleways.
Aaron Hawkins	Independent	Former Green mayor of Dunedin from 2019–2022
Carmen Houlahan	Independent	Candidate in the 2025 election. Dunedin City Councillor from 2019 to 2025
Richard Knights	None	Candidate in the 2025 election
Lianna MacFarlane	Independent	Candidate in the 2025 election. Saddle Hill Community Board member from 2025
Angus MacKay	Independent	
Angela McErlane	None	Incumbent West Harbour Community Board member
Garreth Ottley	None	
Conrad Stedman	None	Candidate in the 2025 election. Dunedin City Councillor from 2016 to 2019
Pamela Taylor	None	Candidate in the 2022 and 2025 elections
Andrew Whiley	None	Candidate in the 2025 election. Dunedin City Councillor from 2013 to 2025

=== Endorsements ===
The Otago Daily Times reported on 10 March that councillors Steve Walker, Christine Garey, and Mickey Treadwell had endorsed former mayor Aaron Hawkins; councillors Andrew Simms, Lee Vandervis, and Russell Lund had endorsed former councillor Conrad Stedman. Benedict Ong declined to endorse any candidates, saying that none of them aligned with "his key priorities of economic development, financial growth and student well-being."

The winning candidate Jo Galer was endorsed by councillors Vandervis and Lund. She campaigned on a platform of prioritising basic infrastructure including in South Dunedin, capping rates and stopping cycleways.

== Result ==
Voting ballots began arriving in the mail from 10 April, with 12 May being designated as the final day of voting. By 25 April, 10,214 votes (10.78%) had been returned. Mayor of Dunedin Sophie Barker attributed the low voter turnout to the by-election being overshadowed by the upcoming 2026 New Zealand general election but added that Dunedin "had a reputation as a city of late voters," with about 25% of votes being cast on the final day of the voting period during the 2025 Dunedin City Council election.

Progress results were released after polls closed on 12 May; Jo Galer had a comfortable lead. Preliminary results were released at 5:30pm on 13 May; Galer was still ahead but with a narrower margin. Final results released on 14 May, Galer's lead decreased even further to only 89 votes. The total voter turnout for the by-election was 33.31% (31,629 voting papers, including special votes).

2026 Dunedin City Council by-election
Party	Candidate	Primary votes	%	±%	Iteration	
Party	Candidate	Primary votes	%	±%	#	Votes
Independent	Jo Galer	5,527	17.47	+16.53	13th	10,201
Independent	Aaron Hawkins	7,740	24.47	(new)	13th	10,112
Independent	Conrad Stedman	4,722	14.93	+13.87	12th	7,447
Independent	Andrew Whiley	4,472	14.14	+12.55	11th	5,724
Independent	Lync Aronson	1,989	6.29	+4.96	10th	2,722
Independent	Bill Acklin	1,635	5.17	+3.77	9th	1,964
Independent	Carmen Houlahan	1,461	4.62	+3.23	8th	1,773
Independent	Richard Knights	1,299	4.11	+3.15	7th	1,469
Independent	Lianna MacFarlane	855	2.70	+1.96	6th	985
Independent	Angus Mackay	736	2.33	(new)	5th	793
Independent	Ange McErlane	655	2.07	(new)	4th	680
Independent	Pamela Taylor	200	0.63	+0.36	3rd	208
Independent	Gareth Ottley	160	0.51	(new)	2nd	163
Independent	Gordon Dickson	53	0.17	(new)	1st	53
Quota		15,752	49.80	n/a		
Informal votes		99	0.31	−1.02		
Blank votes		26	0.08	−0.90		
Turnout		31,629	33.31	−12.08		
Registered electors		94,945				
Independent gain from Independent on 13th iteration						
^{†} incumbent

== Aftermath ==
Following the release of final results on 14 May, the runner-up candidate and former Mayor Aaron Hawkins accused the by-election winner Jo Galer of running a "smear campaign." He took issue with a campaign advertisement by Galer and Councillor Russell Lund alleging that $35 million in funding for stormwater upgrades in the Dunedin area had "disappeared" during his mayoral term in 2021. Hawkins countered that that the statement was inaccurate and contended that the Dunedin City Council had significantly increased the budget for water infrastructure and accelerated some work. In response, Galer and Lund defended their campaign statements, with the former stating: "If he sees that as a smear campaign, well, that's his prerogative, but that's not what was intended by it" and Lund stating that Galer's campaign "dealt in facts."
