= 2010 Dunedin City Council election =

2010 elections in Dunedin, New Zealand

- 9 October 2010
- Position of Dunedin in the South Island

The 2010 Dunedin City Council election was part of the 2010 New Zealand local elections, to elect members to sub-national councils and boards. The Dunedin elections are used to elect the Mayor of Dunedin and to elect councilors to the Dunedin City Council.

As per the Local Electoral Act 2001, all the elections occurred on Saturday 9 October 2010. Voting was carried out by postal ballot, using the single transferable vote system.

== Mayor ==
The candidates for mayor included Peter Chin, the incumbent who was running for a third consecutive term. His contenders included Dave Cull and Lee Vandervis.

== Councillors ==
In 2010 the ward system was changed with there now being just three wards in Dunedin. The Central Ward which would elect eleven councilors, Mosgiel Taieri Ward which would elect two and the Waikouaiti Coast-Chalmers Ward which would elect one.

=== Central ward ===
All eleven incumbent councillors sought re-election, while 28 other people sought election to the council.

Eight of the eleven councillors returned to the council as councillors, while councillor Dave Cull returned as mayor. Three new councillors were elected: Richard Thomson, Lee Vandervis, and Jinty MacTavish.

| Candidate | Affiliation | First preference | | Last Iteration | |
| Candidate | Affiliation | Votes | % | Votes | % |
|---|---|---|---|---|---|
| Richard Thomson | Greater Dunedin | 3741 | 11.28 | 3741.00 | |
| Lee Vandervis | | 3483 | 10.50 | 3483.00 | |
| Bill Acklin | Independent | 2298 | 6.93 | 2722.61 | |
| Jinty MacTavish | Greater Dunedin | 1117 | 3.37 | 2672.69 | |
| John Bezett | Independent | 1893 | 5.71 | 2618.00 | |
| Chris Staynes | Greater Dunedin | 1359 | 4.10 | 2721.21 | |
| Neil Collins | | 1911 | 5.76 | 2709.14 | |
| Teresa Stevenson | Independent | 893 | 2.69 | 2575.58 | |
| Fliss Butcher | Independent | 1269 | 3.83 | 2543.54 | |
| Paul Hudson | Independent | 1261 | 3.80 | 2517.99 | |
| Colin Weatherall | Independent | 1231 | 3.71 | 2514.92 | |
| Bev Butler | Independent | 1221 | 3.68 | 2457.44 | |
| Aaron Hawkins | Independent | 1067 | 3.22 | 2032.22 | |
| Chris Marlow | Independent | 975 | 2.94 | 1779.70 | |
| Malcolm Dixon | Independent | 1132 | 3.41 | 1548.74 | |
| Olivier Lequeux | | 746 | 2.25 | 1218.65 | |
| Lynn Tozer | Greater Dunedin | 729 | 2.20 | 1155.94 | |
| Richard Walls | | 752 | 2.27 | 990.20 | |
| Shane Gallaghar | Greater Dunedin | 670 | 2.02 | 970.98 | |
| Jono Clark | Community VISION | 562 | 1.69 | 762.10 | |
| Jonathan Usher | | 530 | 1.60 | 704.07 | |
| Hendrik Koch | Community VISION | 438 | 1.32 | 581.18 | |
| Samuel Mann | Greater Dunedin | 363 | 1.09 | 480.77 | |
| Andrew Whiley | Independent | 353 | 1.06 | 442.05 | |
| Michael Guest | Independent | 370 | 1.12 | 430.75 | |
| Tracey Crampton Smith | Independent | 337 | 1.02 | 382.74 | |
| Olive McRae | Independent | 278 | 0.84 | 345.37 | |
| Lindsay Smith | Greater Dunedin | 246 | 0.74 | 307.47 | |
| Steve O'Conner | Independent | 230 | 0.69 | 259.41 | |
| Lloyd Wilson | Independent | 184 | 0.55 | 211.64 | |
| Bob Gillanders | | 153 | 0.46 | 182.78 | |
| George Morrison | Independent | 133 | 0.40 | 147.46 | |
| Andrew Eames | Community VISION | 127 | 0.38 | 138.97 | |
| Martini Samson | Independent | 112 | 0.34 | 120.17 | |
| Trevor Turner | Independent | 82 | 0.25 | 97.41 | |
| Barry Simpson | Independent | 73 | 0.22 | (82.18) | |
| Paul Douglas | Independent | 78 | 0.24 | (80.62) | |
| Dave Cull | Greater Dunedin | 0^{a} | 0.00 | (0.00) | |
| Informal votes | | 660 | 1.99 | 660.00 | |

^{a} Dave Cull was already elected mayor, so his votes were immediately transferred to the elector's next preference. Source:

=== Mosgiel Taieri Ward ===
| Name | Affiliation (if any) | Notes |
|---|---|---|
| Kate Wilson | Greater Dunedin | Incumbent |
| Craig Watson | | |
| Malcom Agnow | | |
| Syd Brown | | Deputy mayor |
| Biran Miller | | |
| Maurice Prendergast | | |

=== Waikouaiti Coast-Chalmers Ward ===
| Name | Affiliation (if any) | Notes |
|---|---|---|
| Andrew Noone | | |
| Geraldine Tait | Community Vision | |
