= 2010 Dunedin mayoral election =

New Zealand mayoral election

- 9 October 2010
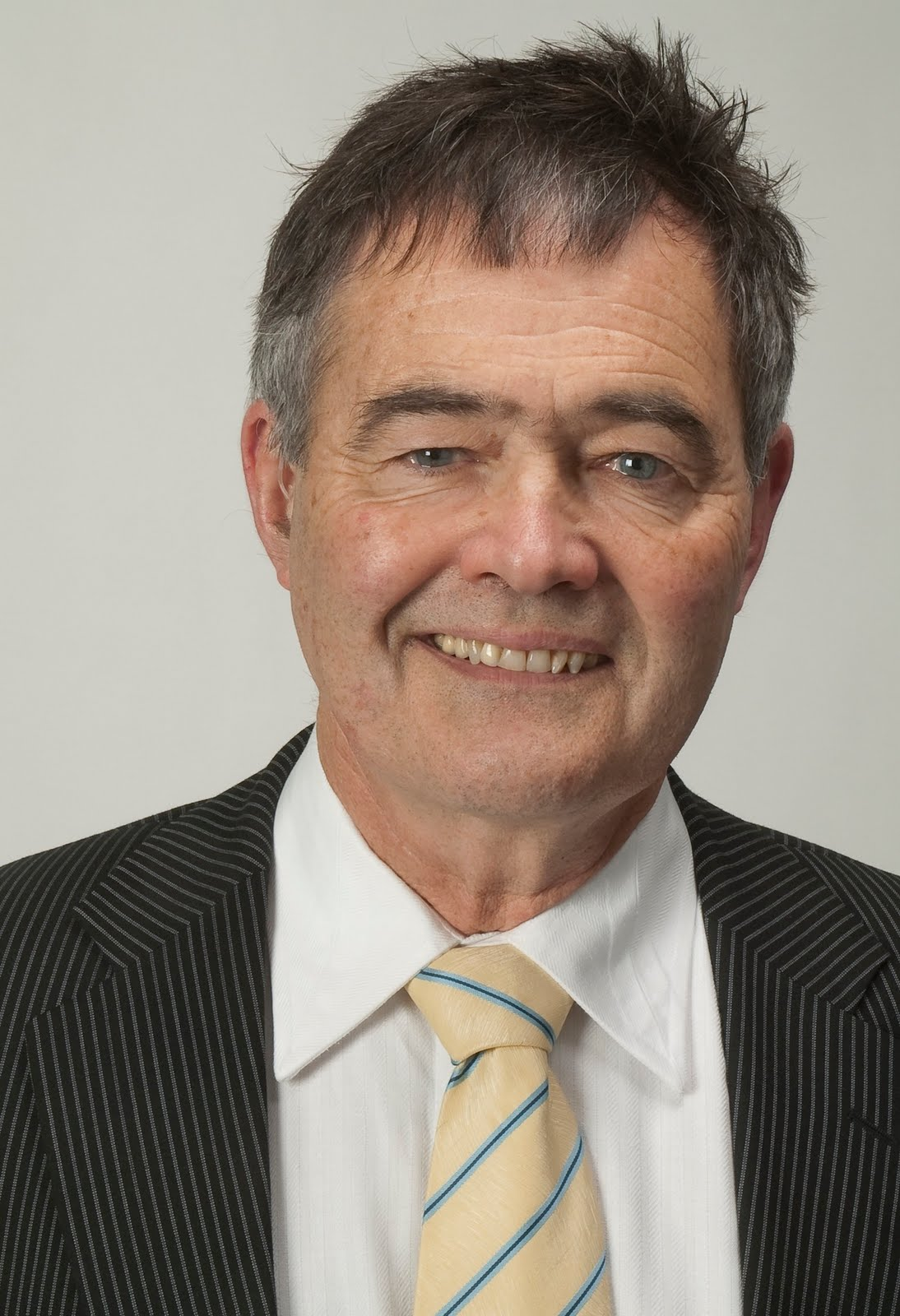

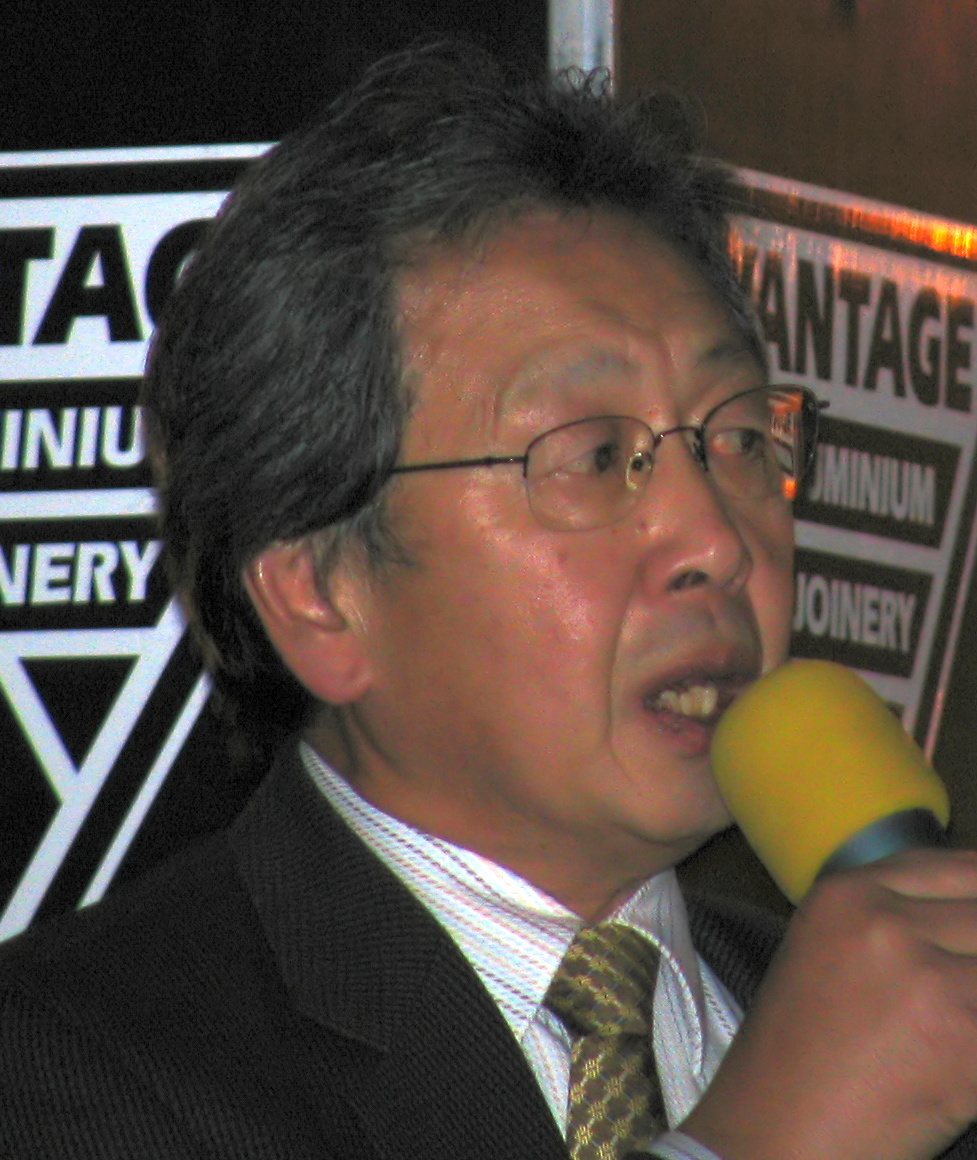

Candidate	Dave Cull	Peter Chin	Lee Vandervis
Party	Greater Dunedin	Independent	Independent
Popular vote	21,757	14,084	5,917
Percentage	48.60	31.46	13.22
Mayor before election
Peter Chin
Elected mayor
Dave Cull

The 2010 Dunedin mayoral election occurred on Saturday, 9 October 2010 and was conducted under the Single Transferable Voting system.

The candidates for mayor included Peter Chin, the incumbent who contested for a third consecutive term. He faced six other candidates. Of these, three stood in the 2007 mayoral race (former councillor Lee Vandervis, who came second, Olivier Lequeux, who came fifth, and Jimmy Knowles, who finished last). Other candidates include incumbent city councillor Dave Cull, Aaron Hawkins and Kevin Dwyer.

Dave Cull won the mayoral election becoming Dunedin's 57th mayor.

== Opinion polling ==
Source	Date (published)	Chin	Cull	Vandervis
ODT	(27 September)	37.4%	45.9%	11%
ODT	6 October	31%	54.2%	11.8%

== Results ==
44770

Candidate	Affiliation	First Preference		Last Iteration	
Candidate	Affiliation	Votes	%	Votes	%
Dave Cull	Greater Dunedin	21,757	48.60	22,832	51.89
Peter Chin	Independent	14,084	31.46	14,453	32.86
Lee Vandervis		5,917	13.22	6,692	15.21
Aaron Hawkins	Independent	1,527	3.41	(469)	-
Olivier Lequeux		1,164	2.60	(227)	-
Kevin Dwyer		197	0.44	(60)	-
Jimmy Knowles		124	0.28	(37)	-
Informal votes		57			
Turnout		45,218	52.34		

== See also ==
- 2010 Dunedin local elections
