= 1995 Dunedin mayoral election =

New Zealand mayoral election

- 14 October 1995
- Turnout: 50,323
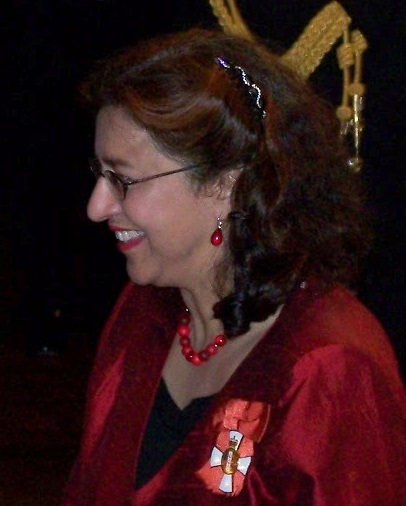

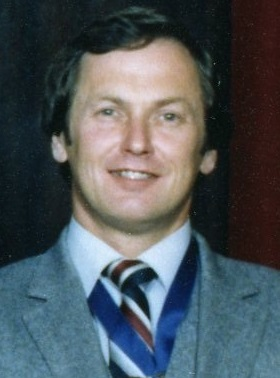
Candidate	Sukhi Turner	Richard Walls
Party	Green	Independent
Popular vote	24,143	21,733
Percentage	47.97	43.18
Mayor before election
Richard Walls
Elected mayor
Sukhi Turner

The 1995 Dunedin mayoral election was part of the New Zealand local elections held that same year. In 1995, elections were held for the Mayor of Dunedin plus other local government positions. The polling was conducted using the standard first-past-the-post electoral method.

== Background ==
Incumbent mayor Richard Walls was defeated by councillor Sukhi Turner in a surprise result.

== Mayoralty results ==
The following table gives the election results:

1995 Dunedin mayoral election
Party	Candidate	Votes	%	±%
Green	Sukhi Turner	24,143	47.97	
Independent	Richard Walls	21,733	43.18	−5.14
Independent	Alan William McDonald	3,864	7.67	−0.48
Informal votes		583	1.15	+0.45
Majority		2,410	4.78	
Turnout		50,323		
