= Stephen Boock =

New Zealand cricketer

Stephen Boock ONZM
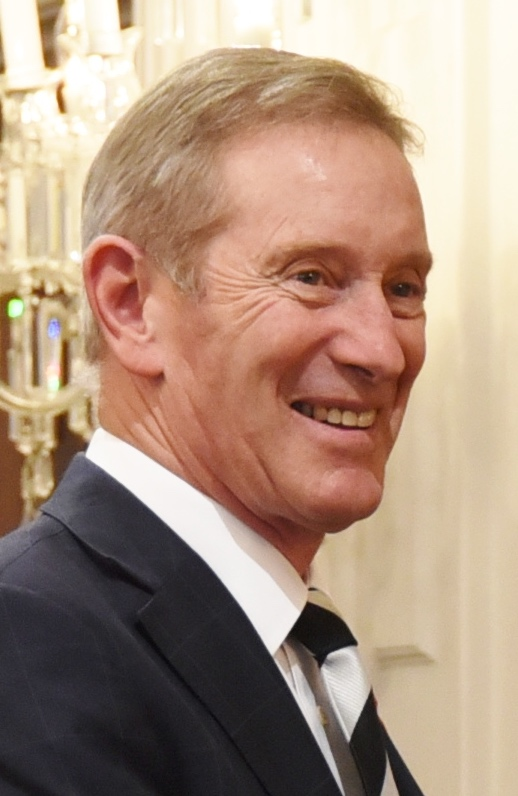
- Boock in 2016

Personal information
- Full name: Stephen Lewis Boock
- Born: 20 September 1951 (age 75); Dunedin, New Zealand
- Batting: Right-handed
- Bowling: Slow left-arm orthodox

International information
- National side: New Zealand (1978–1989)
- Test debut (cap 140): 10 February 1978 v England
- Last Test: 24 February 1989 v Pakistan
- ODI debut (cap 27): 15 July 1978 v England
- Last ODI: 27 October 1987 v Australia

Domestic team information
- Years: Team
- 1973/74–1974/75: Otago
- 1975/76–1977/78: Canterbury
- 1978/79–1989/90: Otago

Career statistics
Competition	Test	ODI	FC	LA
Matches	30	14	164	61
Runs scored	207	30	1,092	118
Batting average	6.27	10.00	8.53	7.37
100s/50s	0/0	0/0	0/0	0/0
Top score	37	12	37	21
Balls bowled	6,598	700	40,707	1,832
Wickets	74	15	640	80
Bowling average	34.64	34.20	22.36	22.90
5 wickets in innings	4	0	40	0
10 wickets in match	0	0	5	0
Best bowling	7/87	3/28	8/57	4/16
Catches/stumpings	14/–	5/–	83/–	21/–
- Source: Cricinfo, 8 April 2017

Stephen Lewis Boock ONZM (born 20 September 1951) is a former New Zealand international cricketer who played 30 Test matches and 14 One Day Internationals for the national team.

He is the brother of sports journalist Richard Boock and award-winning novelist and screenwriter Paula Boock.

== Domestic career ==
Boock was a slow left-arm orthodox bowler and is one of a small number of New Zealanders to have taken over 600 first class wickets. After a Test against Pakistan at Wellington in 1985 he achieved a career high of 9th place in the ICC rankings for Test cricket (applied retrospectively, as the rankings were not introduced until 1987).

== International career ==
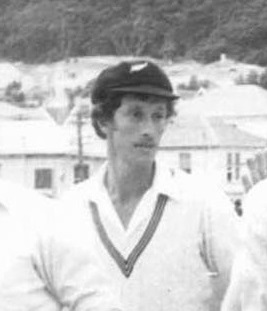
Boock in 1978

Boock made his Test debut at Wellington in February 1978 in New Zealand's maiden Test victory over England. He made his first overseas tour a few months later in England and in the Test Match at Trent Bridge conceded just 29 runs in a 28 over spell which included 18 maidens and 2 wickets.

In 1979/80, at the dramatic conclusion to the First Test against Clive Lloyd's West Indians at Carisbrook, Dunedin, Boock joined Gary Troup at the crease with New Zealand 100 for 9 and needing four more runs to win this historic match. The two tail enders took the Black Caps to their first test win over the West Indies, and what would ultimately become their first series win over the Caribbean giants, when they scrambled through for a leg bye as scores were level. In a controversial tour, marred by umpiring disputes and some ugly on field behaviour by the tourists, New Zealand won the series 1–0 after drawing the next two tests in Christchurch and Auckland.

In 1983–84 New Zealand won their first ever series over England and Boock took 4 for 37 at Christchurch.

In 1984–85 against Pakistan at Niaz Stadium he took his career best innings figures of 7 for 87.

In 1985–86, during the Black Caps' first Test series win over Australia, Boock had a rare success with the bat. He contributed 37 runs in a New Zealand record tenth-wicket partnership of 124 with John Bracewell (83 not out) in the Second Test at the SCG. New Zealand won the series 2–1.

Stephen Boock, when bowling for New Zealand against Pakistan in 1989, conceded the most runs for a New Zealander in a test innings. His 70 overs, 10 maidens for 1 wickets cost 229 runs. This was also the most expensive bowling figures in New Zealand first class cricket until 2010.

== Life post-cricket ==
Boock and his wife owned a supermarket businesses from 1991 until their retirement in 2016.

In 1992 he launched a high-profile campaign for Dunedin's mayoralty. He was unsuccessful, but was elected to the city council for the southern ward.

Boock was a director of NZ Cricket for 10 years and was President of NZ Cricket from 2012 to 2016. He is Chairman of the Otago Special Olympics Trust.

== Honours ==
In the 2016 New Year Honours, Boock was appointed an Officer of the New Zealand Order of Merit for services to sport and the community.
