= Greater Dunedin =

Local body ticket in Dunedin, New Zealand

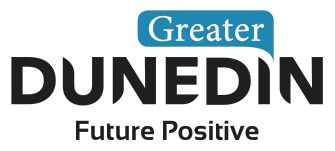
- Leader: Dave Cull
- Founded: 2007
- Dissolved: 2016
- Ideology: Environmentalism; Fiscal responsibility
- Political position: Centre-left
- Colours: Blue & White
- Slogan: Future Positive

Greater Dunedin was a local body ticket in Dunedin, New Zealand. The ticket was formed in 2007 and contested the 2010 Dunedin local elections and 2013 local elections. In February 2016, Mayor Dave Cull dissolved the Greater Dunedin group and announced that it would not be contesting the 2016 local elections.

== History ==
Prior to the 2010 election there were three Greater Dunedin Councillors: Dave Cull, Kate Wilson and Chris Staynes. They along with six other Greater Dunedin candidates ran for council in 2010. Dave Cull was elected mayor.

For the 2013 election, Greater Dunedin candidates included Dave Cull, Jinty MacTavish, Richard Thomson, Mike Lord, Irene Mosley, Kate Wilson, Chris Staynes, Letisha Nicholas and Ali Copeman. Cull was undecided whether or not Carisbrook should be kept as a future sporting venue, but the stadium has since been demolished.

On 26 February 2016, Mayor Cull announced the dissolution of the Greater Dunedin group and that he and the other members would be contesting the upcoming local body elections in October 2016 as independent candidates. Cull's assertion that the dissolution was not caused by any "split within the ranks" was contested by fellow councillor Mike Lord, who disagreed with the Dunedin City Council's ethical investment policy and other unspecified issues. However, he praised the Greater Dunedin group for focusing on council efficiency and debt reduction. Meanwhile, councillor Kate Wilson credited the group with bringing more new councillors into the city council. The dissolution also coincided with a news report that the Labour Party would be contesting the Dunedin local body elections under the "Local Labour" ticket. On 20 April, it was reported that the Labour Party had dropped its plan to field a bloc of candidates in the 2016 Dunedin elections but would still consider endorsing other candidates. Mayor Cull has confirmed that he would also contest the 2016 mayoralty.

== Policies ==
- Fiscal responsibility
- Environmentally friendly
- Economic development
- Reduce compliance costs
- Preserving heritage infrastructure

Dave Cull voted against the construction of the new Forsyth Barr Stadium at University Plaza as did Wilson with Staynes supporting it. Since then all three councilors have objected to the stadium.
