= Gary Troup =

New Zealand cricketer

Gary Troup ONZM
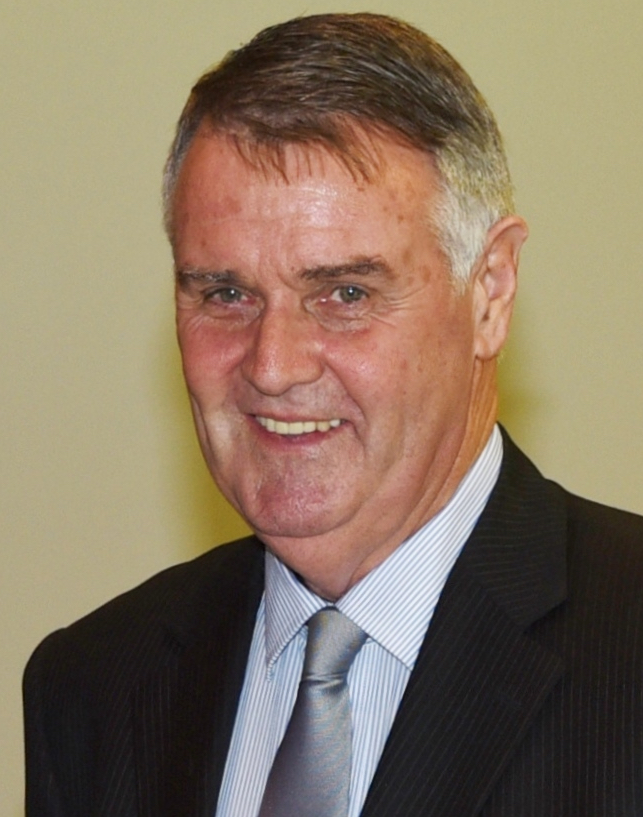
- Troup in 2016

Personal information
- Full name: Gary Bertram Troup
- Born: 2 October 1952 (age 74); Taumarunui, New Zealand
- Batting: Right-handed
- Bowling: Left-arm fast-medium

International information
- National side: New Zealand (1976–1986)
- Test debut (cap 138): 18 November 1976 v India
- Last Test: 28 February 1986 v Australia
- ODI debut (cap 26): 16 October 1976 v Pakistan
- Last ODI: 23 April 1985 v West Indies

Domestic team information
- Years: Team
- 1974/75–1986/87: Auckland

Career statistics
Competition	Test	ODI	FC	LA
Matches	15	22	100	63
Runs scored	55	101	925	213
Batting average	4.58	25.25	12.17	11.83
100s/50s	0/0	0/0	0/0	0/0
Top score	13*	39	60*	39
Balls bowled	3,183	1,180	16,725	3,225
Wickets	39	32	272	95
Bowling average	37.28	24.71	27.72	19.98
5 wickets in innings	1	0	5	0
10 wickets in match	1	0	1	0
Best bowling	6/95	4/19	6/48	4/19
Catches/stumpings	2/–	2/–	39/–	10/–
- Source: Cricinfo, 4 April 2017

Gary Bertram Troup ONZM (born 3 October 1952, in Taumarunui) is a New Zealand former cricketer and local politician who played 15 Test matches and 22 One Day Internationals for New Zealand.

== International career ==
Troup made his Test debut for the New Zealand national team on 18 November 1976 against India.

In 1979/80, at the dramatic conclusion to the First Test against Clive Lloyd's West Indians at Carisbrook, Dunedin, Troup was joined at the crease by Stephen Boock with New Zealand 9/100 and needing four more runs to win this historic match. The two tailenders took the Black Caps to their first test win over the West Indies, and what would ultimately become their first series win over the Caribbean giants, when they scrambled through for a leg bye as scores were level. In a controversial tour, marred by umpiring disputes and some ugly onfield behaviour by the tourists, New Zealand won the series 1–0 after drawing the next two tests in Christchurch and Auckland.

In what was Troup's best test series he finished with 18 wickets for 371 runs (av. 20.61) including a ten wicket haul in the Third Test at Eden Park (4–71 and 6–95).

He played his final test for New Zealand in 1986.

== Political career ==
Troup served twelve years on the Papatoetoe Community Board; six of those years as chairman. He was then elected as a councillor for the Papatoetoe ward on the Manukau City Council in 2007. In April 2008 he was made the Deputy Mayor, replacing Su’a William Sio.

In the 2010 Auckland Council elections Troup ran in the Manukau Ward, placing fifth with 9,136 votes so was not elected as one of the two representatives.

== Honours ==
In the 2016 Queen's Birthday Honours, Troup was appointed an Officer of the New Zealand Order of Merit for services to sport and the community.
