= 2004 Dunedin mayoral election =

New Zealand mayoral election

- 9 October 2004
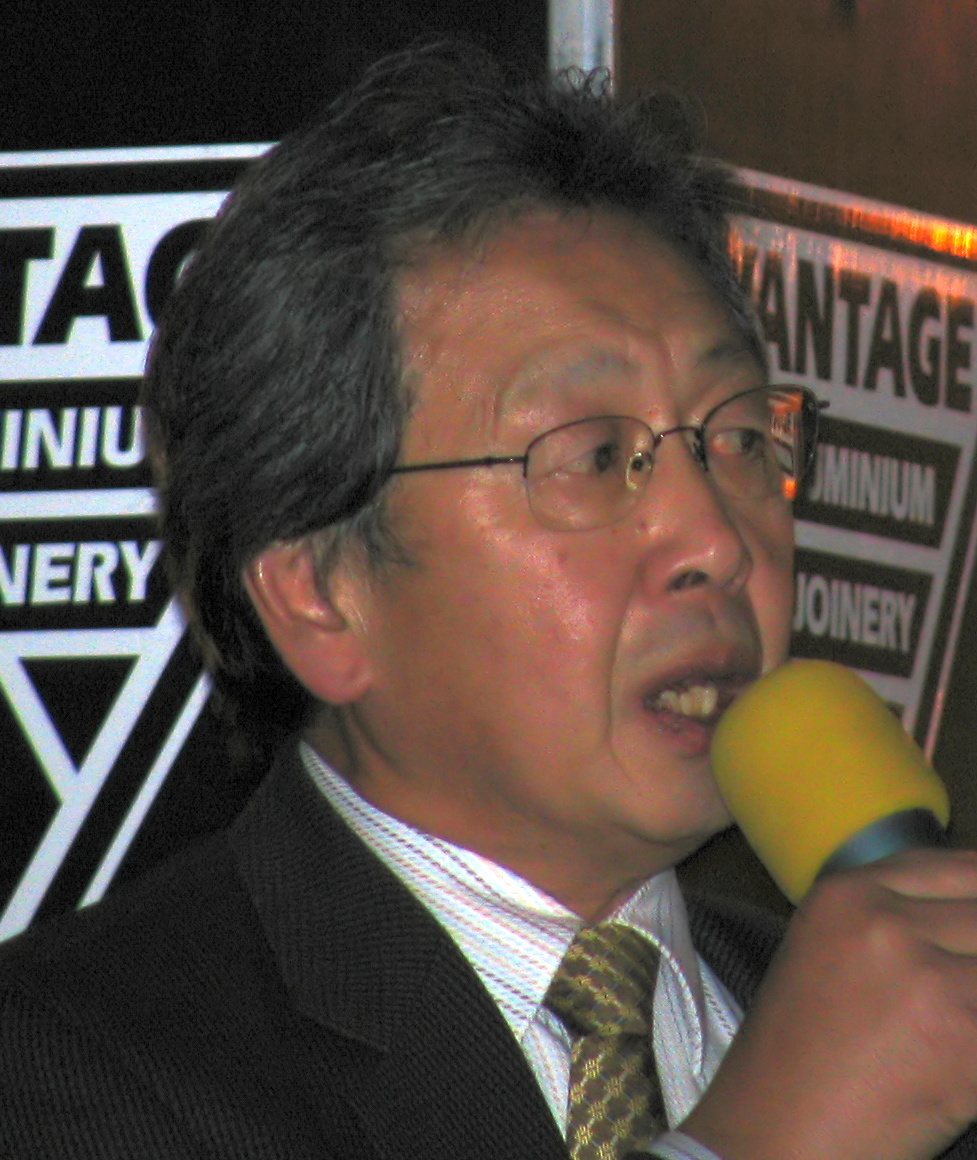

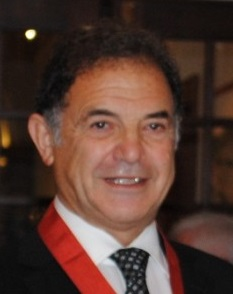
Candidate	Peter Chin	Malcolm Farry
Party	Independent	Independent
Popular vote	23,017	20,029
Percentage	53.5%	46.5%
Mayor before election
Sukhi Turner
Elected mayor
Peter Chin

The 2004 Dunedin mayoral election elected Peter Chin as Mayor of Dunedin. The election was conducted under the Single transferable vote voting system. Chin replaced Sukhi Turner, who retired from the mayoralty.

== Results ==
The following table shows the detailed results for the 9 October 2004 election:

2004 Dunedin mayoral election
Party	Candidate	Votes	%	±%
Independent	Peter Chin	19,862	43.4	
Independent	Malcolm Farry	17,674	38.7	
Independent	Leah McBey	3,688	8.1	
Independent	Teresa Stevenson	2,893	6.3	
Independent	Lee Vandervis	1,414	3.1	
Independent	Jimmy Knowles	189	0.4	
Total formal votes		45,720		
Two-party-preferred result
Independent	Peter Chin	23,017	53.5	
Independent	Malcolm Farry	20,029	46.5	
