= 1998 Dunedin mayoral election =

New Zealand mayoral election

- 10 October 1998
- Turnout: 55,498 (65.45%)
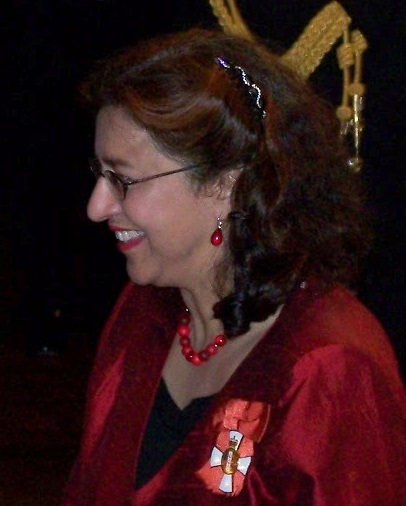

Candidate	Sukhi Turner	Clive Matthewson
Party	Green	Independent
Popular vote	24,143	20,229
Percentage	43.50	36.44
Mayor before election
Sukhi Turner
Elected mayor
Sukhi Turner

The 1998 Dunedin mayoral election re-elected Sukhi Turner as Mayor of Dunedin for a second term. The polling was conducted using the standard first-past-the-post electoral method.

== Results ==
The following table shows the results for the election:

1998 Dunedin mayoral election
Party	Candidate	Votes	%	±%
Green	Sukhi Turner	24,143	43.50	−4.47
Independent	Clive Matthewson	20,229	36.44	
Independent	Paul Hudson	6,397	11.52	
Independent	Neil Collins	2,796	5.03	
Independent	Alan William McDonald	658	1.18	−6.49
Independent	d'ugh Mackie	404	0.72	
Independent	Gregor Campbell	165	0.29	
Informal votes		706	1.27	+0.12
Majority		3,914	7.05	−2.27
Turnout		55,498	65.45	
