= 1992 Dunedin mayoral election =

New Zealand mayoral election

- 10 October 1992
- Turnout: 47,896
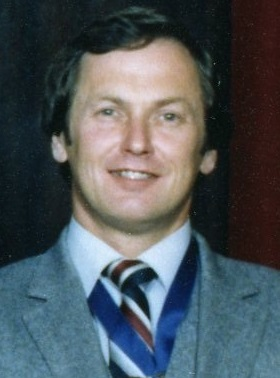

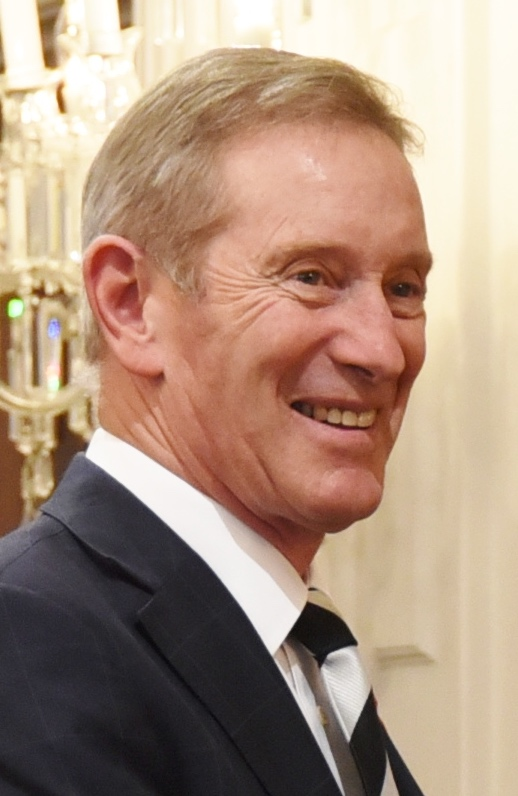
Candidate	Richard Walls	Stephen Boock
Party	Independent	Independent
Popular vote	23,148	16,093
Percentage	48.32	33.59
Mayor before election
Richard Walls
Elected mayor
Richard Walls

The 1992 Dunedin mayoral election was part of the New Zealand local elections held that same year. In 1992, elections were held for the Mayor of Dunedin plus other local government positions including twelve city councillors. The polling was conducted using the standard first-past-the-post electoral method.

== Background ==
Mayor Richard Walls was re-elected, seeing off a high-profile challenge from former cricketer Stephen Boock, who was elected to the council for the Southern ward.

== Results ==
The following table shows the results for the election:

1992 Dunedin mayoral election
Party	Candidate	Votes	%	±%
Independent	Richard Walls	23,148	48.32	+14.46
Independent	Stephen Boock	16,093	33.59	
Independent	Tim Shadbolt	3,946	8.23	
Independent	Alan William McDonald	3,905	8.15	
Independent	Geoffrey Aitken	465	0.97	
Informal votes		339	0.70	+0.15
Majority		7,055	14.72	+0.74
Turnout		47,896		
