= 1989 Dunedin mayoral election =

New Zealand mayoral election

- 14 October 1989
- Turnout: 53,100
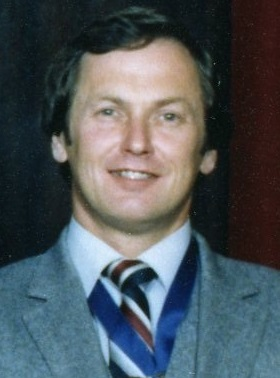

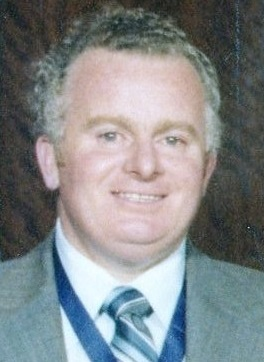

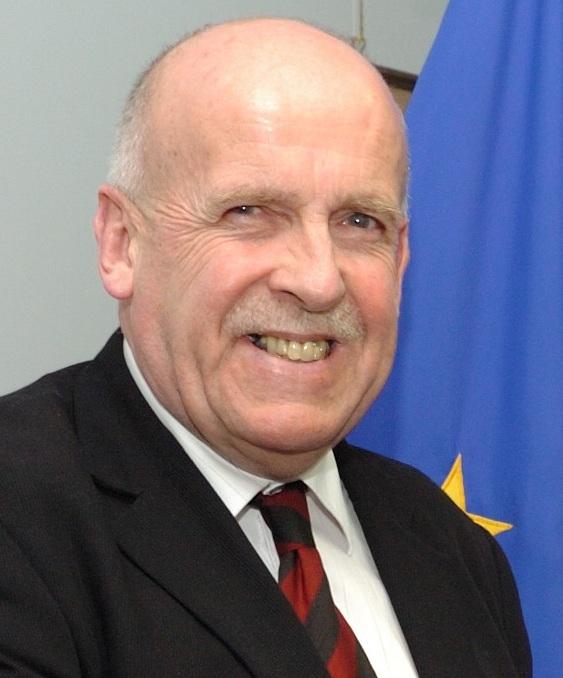
Candidate	Richard Walls	Ian McKeeking
Party	Independent	Independent
Popular vote	17,983	10,556
Percentage	33.86	19.87
Candidate	Michael Haggitt	David Benson-Pope
Party	Citizens'	Labour
Popular vote	8,243	6,381
Percentage	15.52	12.01
Mayor before election
Cliff Skeggs
Elected mayor
Richard Walls

The 1989 Dunedin mayoral election was part of the New Zealand local elections held that same year. In 1989, elections were held for the Mayor of Dunedin plus other local government positions including twelve city councillors. The polling was conducted using the standard first-past-the-post electoral method.

== Background ==
Mayor Cliff Skeggs chose not to seek re-election and a record nine candidates sought to replace him. There were divisions on both sides of local politics in Dunedin. Councillor David Benson-Pope stood as the official Labour candidate, with Labour's candidate from the previous election Steve Alexander also standing. The Citizens' Association had divisions regarding their nominee. Michael Haggitt was chosen as their nominee over councillors Richard Walls and Ian McKeeking. Walls and McKeeking were overlooked due to their affiliations to the National Party. Both stood as independent candidates regardless.

== Results ==
The following table shows the results for the election:

1989 Dunedin mayoral election
Party	Candidate	Votes	%	±%
Independent	Richard Walls	17,983	33.86	
Independent	Ian McKeeking	10,556	19.87	
Citizens'	Michael Haggitt	8,243	15.52	
Labour	David Benson-Pope	6,381	12.01	
Independent	Elizabeth Hanan	5,568	10.48	
Independent Labour	Steve Alexander	2,616	4.92	−22.60
Independent	Paul Brooks	704	1.32	
McGillicuddy Serious	Warren Gumbley	510	0.96	
Independent	Gregor Campbell	242	0.45	
Informal votes		297	0.55	−0.14
Majority		7,427	13.98	
Turnout		53,100		
