= Aaron Hawkins (politician) =

New Zealand politician

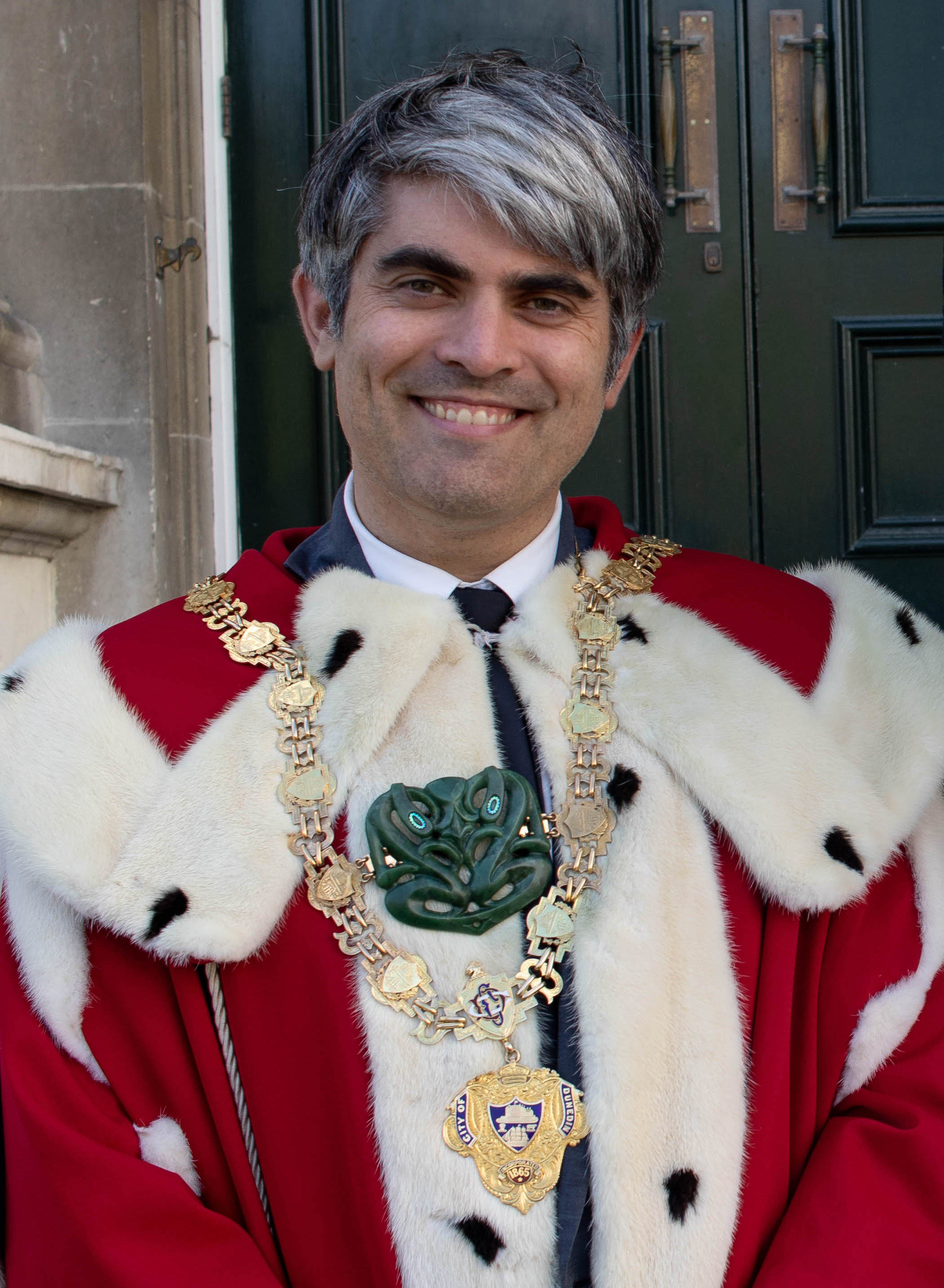
- Hawkins in 2019

58th Mayor of Dunedin
- In office 25 October 2019 – 8 October 2022
- Preceded by: Dave Cull
- Succeeded by: Jules Radich

Personal details
- Born: 1984 Invercargill, New Zealand
- Party: Green
- Spouse: Anya Sinclair (artist)
- Children: 1

Aaron Garth Hawkins (born 1984) is a New Zealand politician who served as the 58th mayor of Dunedin, New Zealand from 2019 to 2022. He was elected as Mayor on 12 October 2019 with 54.54% of the vote, after two prior terms as councillor. He is endorsed by the Green Party. He unsuccessfully stood for re-election as mayor in 2022. Hawkins subsequently co-founded a re-wilding project called Floruit.

== Early life and career before politics ==
Hawkins was born in Invercargill but has lived in Dunedin since 2002 to study at the University of Otago. He lives in Port Chalmers with his wife (artist Anya Sinclair) and son. Before entering politics, Hawkins was the host of Radio One's breakfast show.

== Political career ==
=== Dunedin City councillor ===
Hawkins first stood for council (and mayor) in the 2010 local body election but was not one of the 11 successful candidates after ranking 13th with 3.22% of the vote.

In 2013, he was first elected to Dunedin City Council in the Central Ward as a representative of the Green Party alongside fellow Green candidate Marie Laufiso. However, his campaign for the mayoralty was unsuccessful with 7.5% of the vote. In 2015, he was part of a successful campaign to save, strengthen and restore Dunedin's courthouse building after it was deemed an earthquake risk. In 2016, he was re-elected to council. He contested the mayoralty for a third time, but was not successful and came fifth with 7.7% of the vote. In May 2019, he successfully led a motion asking Councillors to support the protection of Foulden Maar.

As of September 2019, he was the chair of council's community and culture committee, grants committee, refugee steering group and the Mayor's taskforce for housing. He is also a member of the Dunedin Fringe Arts Trust board and the Blue Oyster Arts Trust board and the co-chair of Local Government New Zealand's young elected members committee.

=== Mayor of Dunedin, 2019–2022 ===
During the 2019 Dunedin mayoral election, Hawkins stood for re-election to council and for the mayoralty in 2019 as a representative of the Green Party. With 54.54% of the vote he was successful in the mayoral poll and was the first official Green Party candidate to win a mayoralty.

==== George Street pedestrianisation programme ====
In May 2020, the Dunedin City Council approved a set of measures designed to entice the public back into the CBD following the COVID-19 lockdown. George Street's speed limit was lowered from 30 km/h to 10 km/h, free parking was introduced and businesses were enabled to use footpaths for free. The measures were criticised by opponents as "ideological". Hawkins respond "This has been called part of a wider ideological drive, well of course it is. Everything is ideological... Every opinion expressed by every person in this room is a product of ideology. A product of your values, your knowledge and your perspectives and your opinions. That's what that means.".

In late September 2021, Hawkins supported a vote (9 to 5) in the Dunedin City Council to establish a one-way traffic zone in Dunedin's George Street between Frederick Street and Moray Place in order to increase space for pedestrians and cyclists. While councillors Carmen Houlahan and Lee Vandervis, local businesses and the Automobile Association Otago criticised the proposal on the grounds that it would lead to increased traffic congestion, this was supported by the Otago University Students' Association, CCS Disability Action Otago, and Generation Zero. In response to Hawkins' support for the traffic zone, Dunedin retailer Brent Weatherall barred Hawkins from his George St premises.

==== Three Waters reforms ====
In October 2021, Hawkins has expressed concern about the Sixth Labour Government's Three Waters reform programme, stating that local communities had been denied the opportunity to participate in the discussion. Hawkins had also published an op-ed column expressing concerns about its financial benefits, local consultation and the danger of privatisation.

In mid-February 2022, Hawkins opposed the Dunedin City Council's decision to join "Communities 4 Local Democracy," an advocacy group representing local councils opposed to the Government's Three Waters reform programme. He opined that the group was funding a "futile" legal action against the Government. In response to the DCC's decision to join "Communities 4 Local Democracy," two local Māori runanga (tribal councils) Kati Huirapa ki Puketeraki and Te Runanga o Otakou withdrew from their partnership with the city council; citing a breakdown in their relationship. In late March, the DCC voted by a margin of seven to six to reverse their earlier decision to join "Communities 4 Local Democracy." Hawkins supported overturning the motion on the grounds that it damaged the council's relations with local Māori.

==== 2022 mayoral election ====
In early April 2022, Hawkins confirmed that he would contest the 2022 Dunedin mayoral election. He stood as a Green Party candidate.

In July 2022 Hawkins was among 32 New Zealanders banned from Russia in response to New Zealand Government sanctions.

In early October 2022, Hawkins was defeated in the Dunedin mayoral race by first-term Dunedin City councillor Jules Radich of the Team Dunedin ticket. Hawkins did not stand as a councillor for the Dunedin City Council during the 2022 Dunedin local elections. Hawkins conceded defeat while describing the result as devastating. Hawkins stated that he did not have a budget to go for a "saturation strategy" unlike Radich's Team Dunedin, which plastered posters on streets and shop windows. During the 2022 mayoral election, Hawkins received abuse and harassment including his personal address being published online by an opposing candidate, his family car being paint bombed, and an attempted entry into his home. He attributed the hostility to public unhappiness about the impact of the COVID-19 pandemic in New Zealand and the George Street pedestrianisation programme.

==== 2026 by-election ====
In early February 2026, Hawkins announced that he would be contesting the 2026 Dunedin City Council by-election on 12 May as an independent candidate. The by-election was triggered by the death of former Mayor and sitting councillor Jules Radich. Based on final results, Hawkins came second place at 89 votes behind the winning candidate, Jo Galer. Following the by-election, Hawkins accused Galer of running a "smear campaign" and disputed a campaign advertisement by Galer and Councillor Russell Lund alleging that $35 million in funding for stormwater upgrades in the Dunedin area had "disappeared" during his mayoral term in 2021. He contended that the Dunedin City Council had significantly increased the budget for water infrastructure and accelerated some work. In response, Galer and Lund stood by their campaign statement.

== Outside politics ==
By April 2024, Hawkins had co-founded an enviro-tourism, carbon farming and biodiversity project called Flourit with fellow Dunedin residents Hugh Evans and Blair Boswell. The first project were the Escarpment Domes on former farmland in Pukerua Bay in the Wellington Region.

== Views and positions ==
=== Advertising ===
In late July 2023, Hawkins criticised a Lotto New Zealand advertisement message "Imagine the weather in the Mediterranean $15 million tonight" as "pathetic and incompetent" in light of the ongoing 2023 European heatwaves, which had adversely affected several European and North African countries around the Mediterranean Sea.

=== Race relations ===
In July 2023, Hawkins claimed that criticism of the University of Otago's focus on the Treaty of Waitangi and new logo were motivated by anti-Māori racism. His assertion that the university was institutionally racist was disputed by Otago University Classics fellow Harry Love.

=== Transgender rights ===
In late July 2022, Hawkins expressed support for the transgender community during a DCC public forum. He objected to the nurse Jennifer Scott's remarks likening the inclusion of transgender people in public spaces and toilets as "child abuse," describing her views as "hard to listen to" and "at very least distasteful, if not repugnant."

== Personal life ==
In 2016, he was involved in a near-fatal car accident after skidding on black ice in Halswell near Christchurch. He had to be cut free from the car and suffered a fractured humerus. His wife and son had minor injuries. He does not drive and is known to hitchhike from his home in Port Chalmers.

Hawkins is a vegetarian.

Political offices
Preceded by Dave Cull	Mayor of Dunedin; 2019–2022	Succeeded by Jules Radich
