= Lee Vandervis =

New Zealand politician

Councillor for the Dunedin City Council
- Incumbent
- Assumed office 2004

Personal details
- Born: 1955 (age 70–71) Balclutha, New Zealand
- Occupation: Businessman, politician
- Known for: Dunedin mayoral candidate Opponent of Forsyth Barr Stadium
- Website: Official website

Lee Vandervis (born 1955) is a New Zealand local-body politician who was first elected to the Dunedin City Council (DCC) in the 2004 local elections. Vandervis has run for mayor in 2004, 2007, 2010, 2013, 2016, 2019, 2022 and 2025; finishing second in 2007 and 2019, fourth in 2022 and third in 2025. In each of these elections, Vandervis was elected to the DCC as a councillor.

== Early life and career ==
Lee Vandervis was born in 1955 in Balclutha. He is the second son of Dutch immigrant parents. Vandervis received a BA in Philosophy from the University of Otago, and has worked as a music technician. In the mid 1970s he went to the United Kingdom and worked as an acoustic engineer for Midas Audio. In 1981, Vandervis returned to Dunedin and set up Vandervision Lighting Audio and Video in the early 1980s.

== Politics ==
At the 1984 New Zealand general election Vandervis stood for Bob Jones' New Zealand Party in the Dunedin North electorate. He polled in third place.

=== 2004–2007 and 2010–2013 terms ===
In 2004 Vandervis successfully stood for the Dunedin City as a Council councillor and ran unsuccessfully for Mayor coming third with 9.1% of the vote. In the 2007 election he stood on a platform opposing then proposed replacement stadium for Carisbrook. He was defeated both as a councillor (by a margin of four votes after the counting of the special votes), as well as a mayoral candidate. He came second after the incumbent, Peter Chin, but only gained 17% of the votes. During the 2010 election campaign one of his volunteers installing an election hoarding pierced an 11 kV cable near Mosgiel causing a power outage to 747 consumers. The site had been designated for hoarding by the Council, but no mention of the presence of the cable had been made; the volunteer was unharmed. Vandervis was again third in the Mayoral race with 15.2% of the vote. He was re-elected as a Councillor.

Vandervis served as the Chair of the Dunedin City Council Heritage Fund and the Heritage Buildings Re-use Committee.He resigned from that role on 22 September 2020. He is also on the Board of the Otago Settlers Museum.

Vandervis states that he is focused on challenging misrepresented projects and bureaucratic waste. At times he is controversial. His criticism of Community Board's being a waste of time raised their ire. He has also had clashes over bus shelters, criticised Council's financial management – especially the $480,000 bailout of the Otago Rugby Union, and faced criticism over his suggestion that Christchurch's earthquake rebuild could be shifted to Dunedin.

Vandervis has suggested that Christchurch's proposed stadium would be a waste of money. His comments were based on his experience with Dunedin's Forsyth Barr Stadium. Vandervis supports the rebuild of the Christchurch Cathedral, which was partially destroyed in the earthquakes.

=== 2013–2016 term ===
Lee Vandervis stood for re-election in the October 2013 local election as a Dunedin City Councillor; he also contested the Dunedin mayoralty for the fourth time. He was elected as to Council and placed third for the mayoralty. The Mayor, Dave Cull, did not appoint Vandervis to any committees, commenting that he had no confidence he could contribute constructively, nor maintain any of the relationships needed to do the work effectively.

On 16 March 2015, Lee Vandervis was subject to a code of conduct hearing dealing with three complaints against him for his alleged bullying, aggressive, and misleading behaviour. Vandervis has defended his actions. The city councillor had been involved in an argument with the Dunedin City Council's chief executive Dr Sue Bidrose and had criticised the council and the local police's investigation of the illegal sale of 150 the Council's Cityfleet vehicles to local residents. On 1 May 2015, Vandervis was temporarily stripped of his voting rights after failing to apologise for these actions. According to the Otago Daily Times journalist Kim Dungey, Vandervis was well known within Dunedin circles for his acrimonious relationship with Mayor Cull and several city councillors; taking issue with the council's alleged misspending of public money, the Cityfleet fraud case, and property speculation by Council's Delta Utility Services. In addition, Vandervis has also opposed a 3.8% rates increase and has called for the council to cut back on staff numbers and to "be run more like a business."

=== 2016–2019 term ===
In October 2016, Vandervis contested the 2016 mayoral and local elections. Though he was not elected as Mayor, Vandervis was re-elected to the Dunedin City Council as a councillor.

In July 2017, Vandervis settled a defamation lawsuit against Mayor Cull for NZ$50,000 due to legal delays and spiralling costs. Vandervis had sued Cull following an exchange in December 2015 in which Vandervis alleged that he himself paid bribes to secure a council contract in the 1980s. Vandervis claimed that Cull, in his response to the allegations, had defamed him. Vandervis originally sought NZ$250,000 in general damages and NZ$250,000 in exemplary damages along with legal costs. The lawsuit was settled without an apology.

In late August 2019, the Otago Daily Times reported that Vandervis was the subject of 11 complaints of inappropriate behaviour, angry and shouting, insulting, threatening, unsubstantiated allegations of corruption, and intimidating behaviour against several Dunedin City Council staff members and members of the public. Vandervis was also criticised by Mayor Cull and several fellow councillors including Rachel Elder, Aaron Hawkins, and Mike Lord for alleged bullying and intimidating behaviour. In response, Vandervis defended his actions and claimed that he was the victim of a smear campaign timed to coincide with the 2019 Dunedin mayoral election. In early September 2019, Vandervis drew criticism when he made remarks that young voters were ignorant or did not care about candidates during a mayoral debate organised by the Otago University Students' Association. Vandervis subsequently apologised for his remarks.

=== 2019–2022 parking ticket dispute ===
In mid-September 2019, a twelfth complaint was lodged against Vandervis after he allegedly verbally abused some DCC staff members over a parking ticket. Vandervis contested the complaint and uploaded a CCTV video on social media to support his claim that he did not verbally abuse. David Benham, chairman of the Otago Regional Council's audit and risk subcommittee, was tasked with conducting an independent investigation into the matter. On 10 December, Vandervis was censured by his fellow councillors for the parking ticket incident. In response, he alleged that his privacy was breached at a critical time of the election campaign.

Vandveris litigated the censure and code of conduct review through a 2020 judicial review at the High Court, and in March 2022 appealed the result of this to the Court of Appeal, New Zealand's principal intermediate appellate court. The Court of Appeal agreed with both the judicial review and the initial process that the Council had followed, with the exception of noting that Vandervis should have received a written copy of the allegation made against him. In June 2022 the Dunedin City Council was awarded costs of $101,682.85.

In July 2022 Vandervis sought leave from the Supreme Court of New Zealand to hear the case. The Supreme Court rejected Vandervis' legal team's application for leave to appeal his parking ticket fine in September. The Supreme Court also upheld the Court of Appeal's decision to uphold Vandervis' ticket fine.

=== 2019–2022 term ===
On 12 October 2019, Vandervis was re-elected to the Dunedin City Council as a councillor but lost the mayoral contest to Green Party of Aotearoa New Zealand candidate Aaron Hawkins.

In mid-October 2020, independent investigator Steph Dyhrberg found that Vandervis had engaged in intimidatory behaviour during an argument with Deputy Mayor Christine Garey in late July 2020. While apologising for his conduct, Vandervis defended his efforts to hold city councillors and staff to account for allegedly "not doing their job." During a conduct hearing held on 27 October, Vandervis' fellow councillors called on him to apologise for his behaviour and seek professional help with anger management, with Mayor Aaron Hawkins likening him to a four-year old. Vandervis remained defiant during the hearing, alleging that the problem was council mismanagement and misrepresentation. The Dunedin City Council also warned Vandervis that they would revoke his membership of the Otago Museum Trust Board and the district licensing committee if a "suitable apology" was not delivered.

In August 2021, Vandervis disagreed with the Dunedin City Council's proposal for a destination playground, instead advocating adventure playgrounds where children and young people can play with water, fire, and build with pallets. Vandervis' views were supported by University of Otago geography Professor Claire Freeman, who said that contemporary children experienced less freedom than previous generations, reducing their ability to handle risk.

In mid-September 2021, Vandervis attracted media attention and criticism after he published several COVID-19–related social media posts questioning the effectiveness of the Pfizer–BioNTech COVID-19 vaccine and advocating the use of the anti-parasitic drug Ivermectin for treating COVID-19.

In early October 2021, Vandervis led an anti-lockdown "Families Freedom Picnic" that was held in Dunedin's Queens Gardens. During the protest, Vandervis spoke about the effects of lockdown regulations on local businesses, freedom of speech, and the pressure to be vaccinated.

In November 2021 Vandervis voted against a proposed rainbow pedestrian crossing (styled after the Cuba Street rainbow crossing). The proposal was initiated by Dudley Benson, to create a visual representation of Dunedin's queer community and stand against bullying, homophobia and transphobia. A petition in support for the crossing received 6,502 signatures. As the only councillor of 14 who voted against the proposal, Vandervis said: "To me, this is quite seriously a piece of ridiculous PC virtue signalling." Deputy Mayor Christine Garey said Vandervis' comments regarding the proposal were ‘‘offensive and embarrassing in 2021 in our city’’.

In early December 2021, Vandervis objected to the Dunedin City Council's vaccine pass requirement for accessing council premises and services as part of the New Zealand Government's COVID-19 Protection Framework. Since Vandervis had chosen not to get vaccinated for COVID-19, he was only allowed to attend virtual council meetings. He claimed that the Governments' COVID-19 policies breached the right to refuse medical treatment under the New Zealand Bill of Rights Act 1990, free speech, lawful assembly, and justice. On 7 December, Vandervis was trespassed from the Dunedin City Council for three months after attempting to attend meeting without a COVID-19 vaccine pass. Vandervis objected to the trespass notice, claiming that access to essential services could not be restricted based on vaccine status.

On 23 February 2022, Vandervis supported fellow councillor Andrew Whiley's motion for the Dunedin City Council to join "Communities 4 Local Democracy," a coalition of local bodies opposed to the Government's Three Waters reform programme. The motion passed by a narrow margin of eight to seven votes. On 29 March, the DCC voted by a margin of seven to six to overturn their earlier decision to join "Communities 4 Local Democracy" following a breakdown in the Council's relationship with local Māori runanga (tribal councils). In response, Vandervis condemned the reversal as a rejection of local democracy in favour of "centralised control."

In late April 2022, Vandervis was identified as having personally edited his own Wikipedia page, in breach of Wikipedia's conflict of interest policy. His edits removed several relevant passages in the article, including references to various incidents that cast Vandervis in a negative light. These edits were subsequently reversed.

In mid June 2022, Vandervis drew media attention when he questioned the facts of the September 11 attacks, disputing official and eyewitness accounts that two planes had destroyed the World Trade Center's skyscrapers.

=== 2022–2025 term ===
During the 2022 Dunedin City Council election, Vandervis ran for Mayor and campaigned on reducing the city's projected debt of NZ$106 million and accused the Dunedin City Council of increasing debt each year. Though he was defeated during the mayoral race, Lee Vandervis was re-elected as a city councillor.

On 19 October 2022, he was appointed by Mayor Jules Radich as chairman of finance and council-owned companies. In allocating Vandervis' appointment, Radich described Vandervis as an "astute communicator with constructive ideas" whose past conduct issues had been caused by frustration with the Council leadership. After he and his fellow councillors were sworn in on 27 October 2022, Vandervis was the only DCC member to oppose the Māori runanga (tribal councils) Kati Huirapa ki Puketeraki and Otakou sending representatives to participate in two Council committees.

In late February 2023, the DCC voted to remove Vandervis as chair of the Council's Disability Issues Advisory Group following concerns raised by the Disabled Persons' Assembly due to Vandervis' remarks towards a disabled candidate named Joshua Perry during the 2016 local body elections. The Council subsequently appointed first-term councillor Mandy Mayhem to the position and reassigned Vandervis as the Council's representative to Age Concern. In response, Vandervis denied that he had intimidated Perry and claimed that their private conversation was being used against him as part of a smear campaign.

In late March 2023, Vandervis was the only member of the Dunedin City Council to accept an invitation to meet with Vision NZ founder Hannah Tamaki and her husband Brian Tamaki, the founder and leader of Destiny Church. Following the meeting, 50 counter-demonstrators including fellow Dunedin councillors Steve Walker and Marie Laufiso held a rally to protest against the Tamaki's visit to Dunedin.

In early November 2023, Vandervis criticised a DCC draft submission about emergency management law during a council meeting, claiming that it had a disproportionate focus on "Māori inclusion, Māori remuneration and co-governance." During that meeting, Vandervis traded barbs with fellow councillor Laufiso, who accused him of racism. The Council's submission was subsequently approved by the Council with the exception of Vandervis.

In early January 2024, Laufiso laid a formal complaint against Vandervis for allegedly showing contempt towards Māori people by refusing to participate in a council forum called Te Pae Māori. Laufiso also claimed that Vandervis made disparaging remarks about Te Pae Māori, which constituted a breach of the DCC's code of conduct. In addition, Vandervis had objected to Claude Monet's La Debacle work at the Dunedin Public Art Gallery being accompanied by what he regarded as an "irrelevant" Māori language text. On 3 January 2024, the DCC confirmed that it had appointed independent investigator Jonathan Boyle to investigate the complaint against Vandervis.

In mid-March 2024, Vandervis was the sole councillor to oppose a DCC motion to adopt draft operating budgets for the purpose of community engagement. The Council had proposed increasing rates by 17.5%. In his response, Vandervis said that "what is evident to me is that we cannot wantonly spend our way to success. We cannot increase debt by over $100m a year to success."

On 29 May, Vandervis was the only member of the Dunedin City Council to vote against a motion asking the New Zealand government to create special visas for Palestinian refugees by a margin of 14 to one votes in response to the Gaza war. He said: "Taking international political positions is not the business of the council ... Why should we take Palestinian refugees when Egypt, Jordan and other Arab countries are unwilling?"

On 31 July 2024, the independent investigator Jordan Boyle concluded that Vandervis had breached the DCC's code of conduct through an email he had sent on 16 July 2023, his non-attendance of Te Pae Māori meetings and for describing the council committee's mana whenua members as "anti-democratic" and "race-based" representation. The Council accepted Boyle's report and called upon Vandervis to apologise for his actions. Vandervis issued a prepared statement stating that "I vow to continue to exercise my right to free speech in the public interest and to be part of the diversity necessary for democratic representation on the Dunedin City Council." Vandervis also doubled down on his remarks objecting to alleged "race-based" funding of Māori elites and jobs and accused his critics of being racist for allegedly labelling him "pale, stale, and male." The Mayor of Invercargill Nobby Clark's partner Karen defended Vandervis. On 21 August 2024, Vandervis apologised for his comments after Cr Marie Laufiso's code of conduct complaint was upheld.

On 25 September 2024, Vandervis and Deputy Mayor Cherry Lucas unsuccessfully voted against a Council motion to retain council ownership of energy company Aurora Energy, describing Aurora as a "Rolls Royce, high cost, high maintenance vehicle when the DCC can only afford to run a Toyota."

On 22 May 2025, Vandervis confirmed he would contest both the 2025 Dunedin mayoral election and the 2025 Dunedin local elections as a mayoral and city council candidate. This marks the eighth time that Vandervis has run as a candidate for mayor of Dunedin.

On 26 August 2025, Vandervis voted against a DCC motion to scrap the contentious Albany Street road connection project, which passed by a vote of 8 to 7 votes. The Albany Street road connection project would have involved installing a cycleway and removing 48 carparks near the University of Otago. Local business owners had criticised the DCC for not consulting them about the proposed project. Mayor Jules Radich has used his casting vote to pass the motion after Cr Jim O'Malley recused himself from the proceedings. That same day, Vandervis voted in favour of a motion to scrap free Sunday parking in the Dunedin city centre, which passed by a vote of 11 to 4. On 23 September 2025, Vandervis unsuccessfully voted against Cr Christine Garey's motion to revoke the Council's decision to cancel the Albany Street connection, which passed by a margin of eight to seven votes. In response, Vandervis said that situation should be dealt with by the next council.

=== 2025–2028 term ===
During the 2025 Dunedin City Council election, Vandervis ran for both the City Council and mayoral races, campaigning on a platform of reducing rates and "freeing" Dunedin from the Otago Regional Council (ORC). Following the conclusion of voting on 11 October, Vandervis came third place in the mayoral race but was elected as a councillor. In late October 2025, Vandervis questioned the job credentials of newly-elected fellow councillor Benedict Ong. Vandervis later accepted that Ong had previously worked for Rabobank but sought verification that Ong had served as vice-president for several international banks including the Royal Bank of Canada, Rabobank, United Overseas Bank and J. Safra Sarasin. Vandervis also called for changes to campaign spending rules in local body elections, arguing that contemporary legislation allowed tickets to find loopholes around cost caps by spreading expenses among candidates.

On 8 November 2025, Mayor Sophie Barker appointed Vandervis as deputy chairman of the infrastructure portfolio as part of a transition from a committee to portfolio-based governance model. Vandervis objected to Barker appointing him and fellow Cr Andrew Simms to deputy portfolios, accusing the Mayor of being insecure and seeking to suppress her former mayoral contenders. On 11 November, Vandervis declined to accept two deputy finance and infrastructure roles, which he described as a "non-functioning slop." Vandervis also opposed the new portfolio structure and pay rates but was outnumbered by the other councillors. On 14 November, Vandervis accused Barker of misleading him about being appointed chairman of the finance portfolio. In response, Baker said there was a misunderstanding.

On 12 November 2025, Vandervis unsuccessfully opposed a council motion to accept a budget overspend on the contentious Albany Street Connection Project, which passed by a margin of 8 to 7 votes. Prior to the 2025 local elections, the DCC had initially voted to cancel the project before rescinding the cancellation. Following the National-led coalition government's announcement that it would introduce legislation in 2026 to disestablish the regional councils, Vandervis advocated that the Otago Regional Council return Otago Harbour and the harbourside land to Dunedin. Mayor Barker and ORC councillor Michael Laws expressed disagreement with his proposal, with the latter stating that the Port of Otago was a regional asset.

In late November 2025, Vandervis along with fellows councillors Andrew Simms, Jules Radich, John Chambers, Russell Lund and Doug Hall met with residents of Surrey Street to raise awareness of sewage overflows during flooding. The meeting was organised by Simms, who was critical of the Council's response to the street's sewage problems. In early December 2025, Mayor Barker appointed Vandervis as chair of a new portfolio for council-controlled organisations. Vandervis welcomed the appointment and credited Deputy Mayor Cherry Lucas with negotiating with Barker to appoint him to an executive position within the DCC.

On 11 May 2026, Vandervis and fellow councillors Andrew Simms and Russell Lund proposed in an Otago Daily Times op-ed column that a Dunedin-Waitaki authority take over control and management of Port Otago as part of the Sixth National Government's local government reforms. Mayor of Dunedin Sophie Barker expressed support for the idea due to the estimated NZ$1 billion value of the port. In response, ORC chairperson Hilary Calvert and councillor Michael Laws expressed disagreement, contending that Port Otago was a regional asset. The following day, Vandervis told Calvert and Laws to "butt out" and supported the Government's plans to disestablish regional councils. In response, Laws argued that Port Otago's future ownership was relevant to the 80,000 residents of his Dunstan ward.

On 30 October 2026, Vandervis supported councillor Andrew Simm's resolution to hold a referendum at the 2028 New Zealand local elections on whether to retain the Dunedin City Council's Single Transferrable Vote (STV) system or to revert to the First Past the Post system. The resolution passed by a margin of 8 to 5 votes.

== Personal life ==
Vandervis is twice married and has eight children. He also has a severely autistic son.

== Notes ==
1."Destination playgrounds are typically larger playgrounds set in a location that may require a drive to reach."
