= 2019 Dunedin mayoral election =

New Zealand mayoral election

- 12 October 2019
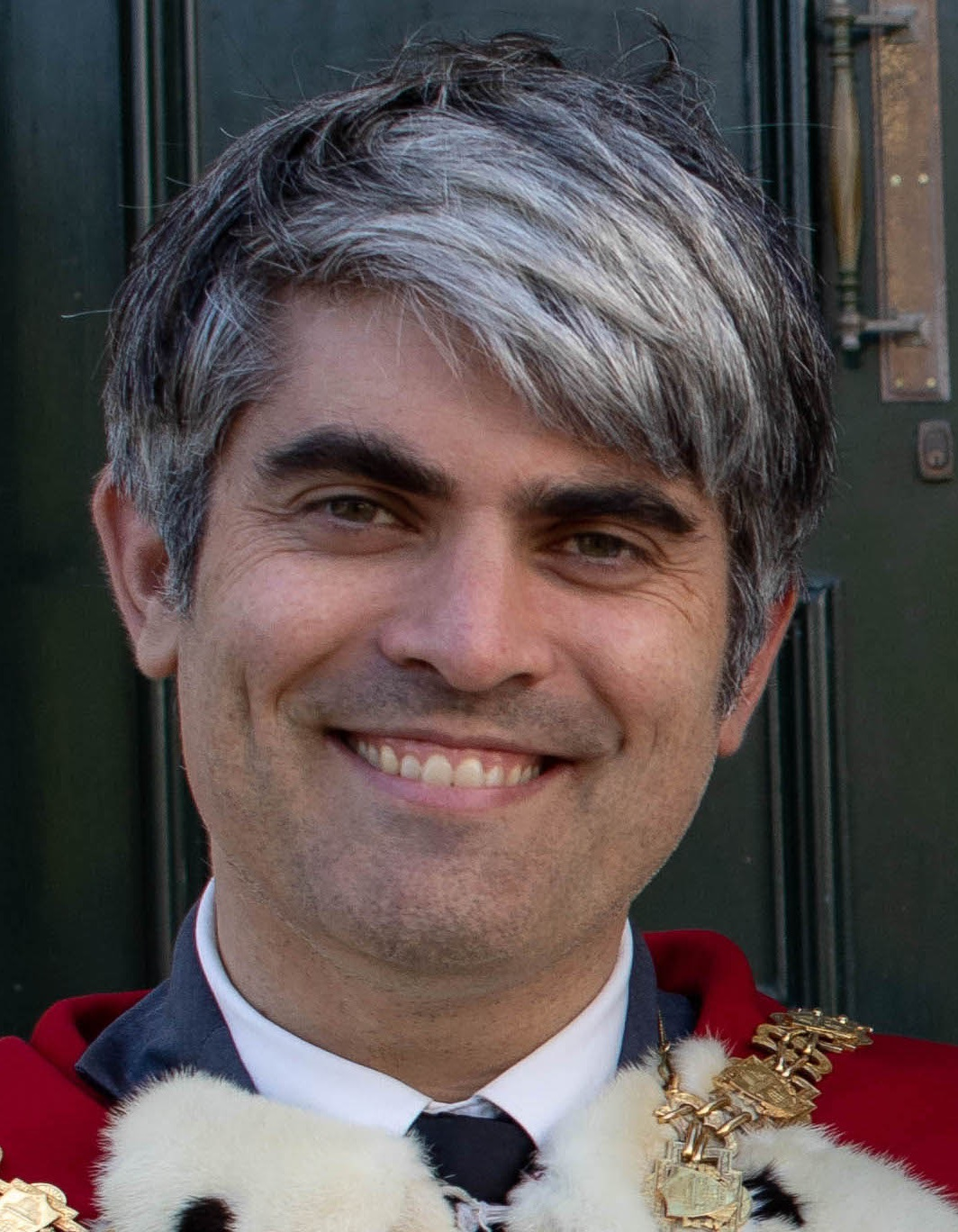

Candidate	Aaron Hawkins	Lee Vandervis
Party	Green	Independent
Popular vote	17,222	14,351
Percentage	54.54	45.46
Mayor before election
Dave Cull
Elected mayor
Aaron Hawkins

The 2019 Dunedin mayoral election was held on 12 October 2019. It was conducted with a single transferable vote (STV) system. Aaron Hawkins was elected for his first term as Dunedin's 58th Mayor after beating 13 other candidates. Nominations opened on 19 July 2019 and closed on 16 August 2019.

== Candidates ==
=== Declared candidates ===
- Scout Barbour-Evans
- Bob Barlin
- Finn Campbell
- Rachel Elder, Dunedin City Councillor
- Christine Garey, Dunedin City Councillor
- Aaron Hawkins, Dunedin City Councillor
- Carmen Houlahan
- Mandy Mayhem-Bullock, Waikouaiti Coast Community Board member
- Malcolm Moncrief-Spittle
- Jim O'Malley, Dunedin City Councillor
- Jules Radich, business consultant
- Richard Seager
- Lee Vandervis, Dunedin City Councillor
- Andrew Whiley, Dunedin City Councillor

=== Declined to be candidates ===
- Dave Cull, incumbent Mayor
- Barry Timmings, businessman

== Results ==
Candidate	Affiliation	First Preference			Last Iteration	
Candidate	Affiliation	Votes	%	+/-	Votes	%
Aaron Hawkins	Green Dunedin	9,074	20.97	+13.18	17,222	54.54
Lee Vandervis	Independent	9,481	21.91	+4.20	14,351	45.46
Andrew Whiley		5,222	12.07	+0.42		
Christine Garey		4,755	10.99			
Jim O'Malley	Independent	4,534	10.48	+4.21		
Jules Radich	Independent	3,845	8.88			
Carmen Houlahan	Independent	1,577	3.64			
Bob Barlin	Independent	1,290	2.98			
Rachel Elder		1,262	2.91	−1.44		
Mandy Mayhem-Bullock		729	1.68			
Finn Campbell	Independent Youth	524	1.21			
Scout Barbour-Evans	Independent	393	0.90	−1.47		
Richard Seagar	Independent ecological democrat	319	0.73			
Malcolm Moncrief-Spittle		253	0.58			
Informal votes						
Turnout		45.6%				
