= 2016 Dunedin mayoral election =

New Zealand mayoral election

- 8 October 2016
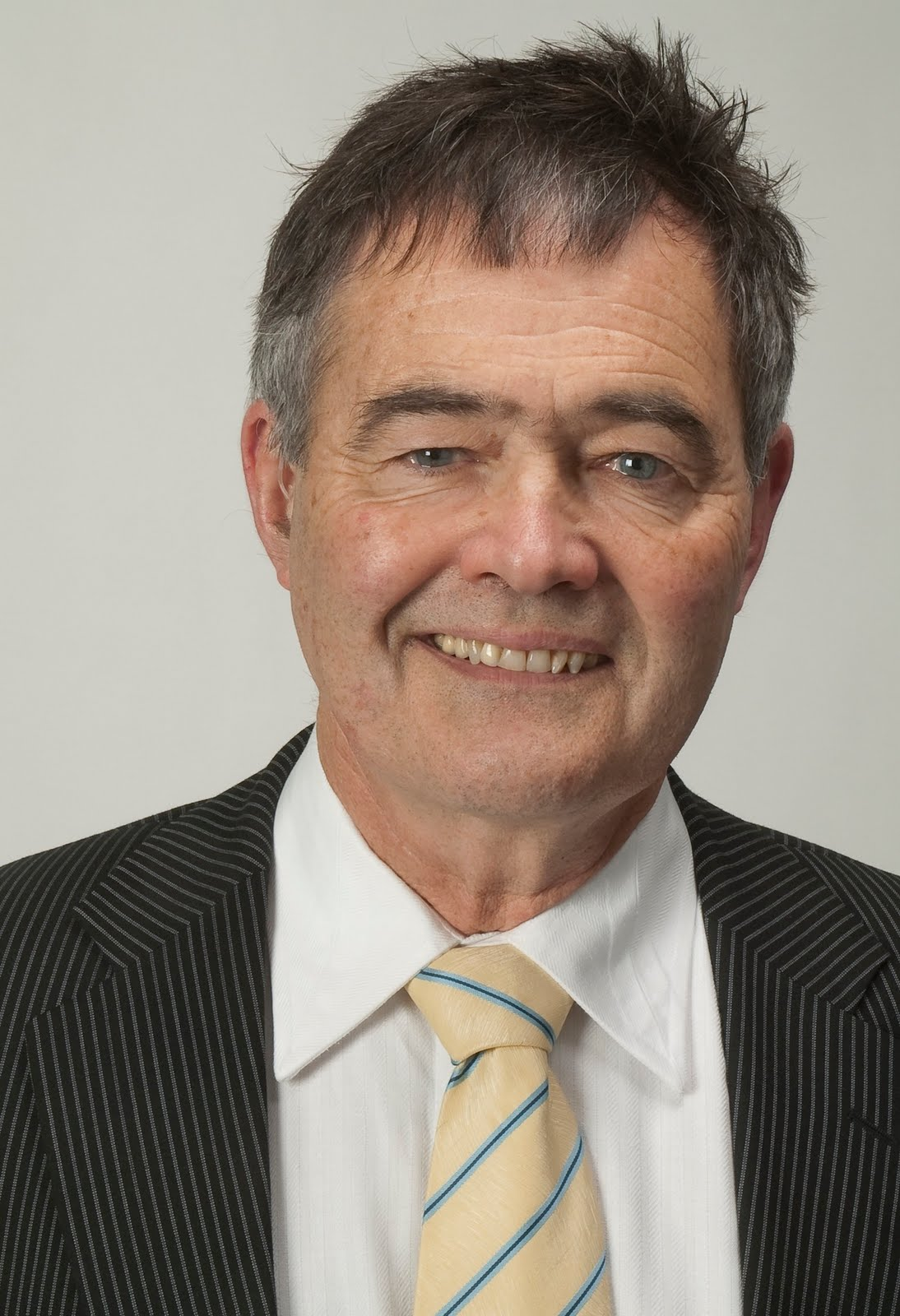
Candidate	Dave Cull	Lee Vandervis
Party	Independent	Independent
Popular vote	17,441	11,938
Percentage	59.4	40.6
Mayor before election
Dave Cull
Independent
Elected mayor
Dave Cull
Independent

The 2016 Dunedin mayoral election was held on Saturday, 8 October 2016 and was conducted under the single transferable voting system. Dave Cull, Dunedin's 57th mayor, was re-elected after seeing off ten challengers.

== Results ==
Cull was re-elected, defeating centre-right challenger Lee Vandervis in the tenth and final iteration of votes; however, Cull's first preference vote was severely reduced.

Candidate	Affiliation	First Preference			Last Iteration	
Candidate	Affiliation	Votes	%	+/-	Votes	%
Dave Cull	Independent	10,816	27.1	-22.2	17,441	59.4
Lee Vandervis	Independent	7,063	17.7	+2.5	11,938	40.6
Barry Timmings		5,613	14.0			
Andrew Whiley		4,647	11.6	+4.4		
Aaron Hawkins	Green Dunedin	3,108	7.7	+0.2		
Jim O'Malley		2,501	6.2			
Conrad Stedman	Independent	2,086	5.2			
Rachel Elder		1,734	4.3			
Scout Barbour-Evans		945	2.3			
Abe Gray		734	1.8			
Athold Bayne	Stand up for Dunedin	612	1.5			
Informal votes		N/A				
Turnout		39,859				
