= Peter Chin =

56th Mayor of Dunedin

Peter Chin CNZM
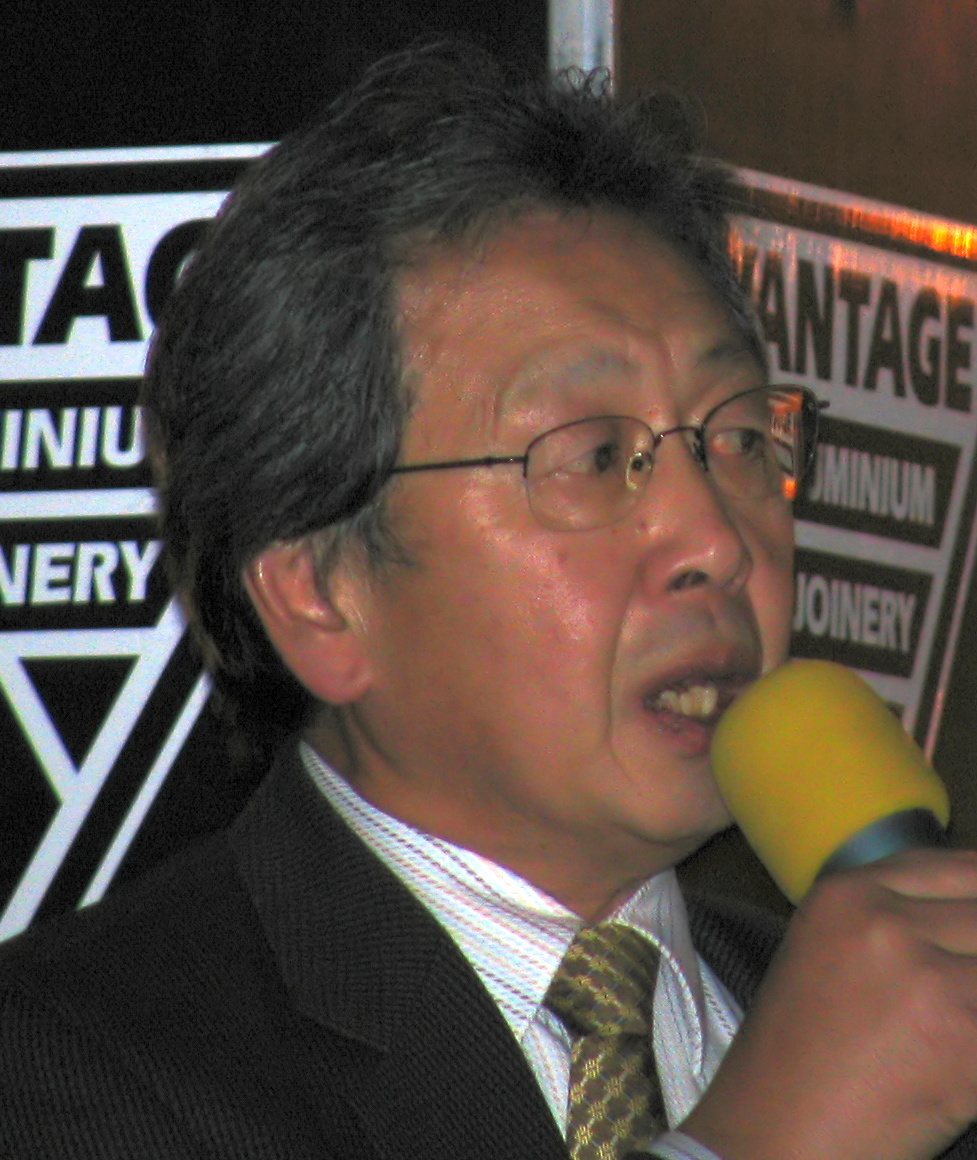
- Chin in 2010

56th Mayor of Dunedin
- In office 2004–2010
- Preceded by: Sukhi Turner
- Succeeded by: Dave Cull

Personal details
- Born: Peter Wing Ho Chin; 1941 (age 84–85)
- Occupation: Lawyer

Peter Wing Ho Chin CNZM (Chinese: 陳荣和; Jyutping: can4 wing4 wo4; pinyin: Chén Rónghé, born 1941) is a lawyer and was the 56th Mayor of Dunedin, New Zealand. He served two terms as Mayor from 2004 to 2010.

== Early life and career ==
Peter Chin is a descendant of the earliest Chinese immigrants to New Zealand, and his family owned a fish and chips take-away establishment in Dunedin.

In the 1950s Chin was a student at Otago Boys' High School and then the University of Otago, graduating with an LLB in 1965. He started working as a lawyer in Dunedin in 1968 and became a founding partner at the Otago law firm Webb Farry. He also took up a position in the Otago District Law Society.

== Mayoral career ==
Chin was first elected in 1995 as a councillor in the Dunedin City Council, representing the Hills Ward. He served three terms before being elected as Mayor during the 2004 Dunedin mayoral election, replacing Sukhi Turner who was retiring as mayor. He was re-elected during the 2007 Dunedin mayoral election with an absolute majority.

As Mayor, Chin supported the Forsyth Barr Stadium, which drew controversy over its cost and source of funding. In the course of examining funding options he sent a confidential letter to the Government asking for money without full Council approval, and was on a committee of three that later censured Councillor Teresa Stevenson for leaking the letter to the Otago Daily Times.

== Post-mayoral career ==
During the 2010 Dunedin mayoral election, Peter Chin was defeated by Greater Dunedin candidate and Dunedin City Council councillor Dave Cull. He was one of the twelve members of the Constitutional Advisory Panel, which sought public input on a written constitution for New Zealand, since 2011.

== Community involvement ==
In addition to his professional and mayoral career, Chin served as the chair of the Otago Community Trust, the Chinese Garden Trust, the Otago District Law Society and head of the Gambling Commission, the government-appointed panel that regulates casinos. In the 2003 New Year Honours, he was appointed a Companion of the New Zealand Order of Merit, for services to local-body and community affairs.

As chair of the Chinese Gardens Trust, Chin presided over the building of the Dunedin Chinese Garden, which received NZ$3.75 million in public funding and NZ$1 million in ratepayer funding. The Chinese Garden opened in May 2008. The Garden was constructed in an authentic manner, using almost a thousand tonnes of rocks imported from Lake Tai, China.

He also served the chair of the national Chinese Poll Tax Heritage Trust, which was set up with government funding in 2004. The trust aims to raise awareness of the early Chinese community in New Zealand and its history, language and culture.

== Personal life ==
Chin has been married to Noleen since 1964 with whom he had 4 children. he lives in Roslyn and is a prominent opera singer. Chin suffered a heart attack on New Year's eve, 2014 whilst on a plane from Dunedin to Wellington to visit his son. He had a triple bypass and later recovered.

== Filmography ==
Chin played a minor part in the 1987 film Illustrious Energy, a historic drama based on the experiences of Chinese gold miners in Central Otago.

Political offices
Preceded by Sukhi Turner	Mayor of Dunedin; 2004-2010	Succeeded by Dave Cull
