= 2007 Dunedin mayoral election =

New Zealand mayoral election

- 13 October 2007
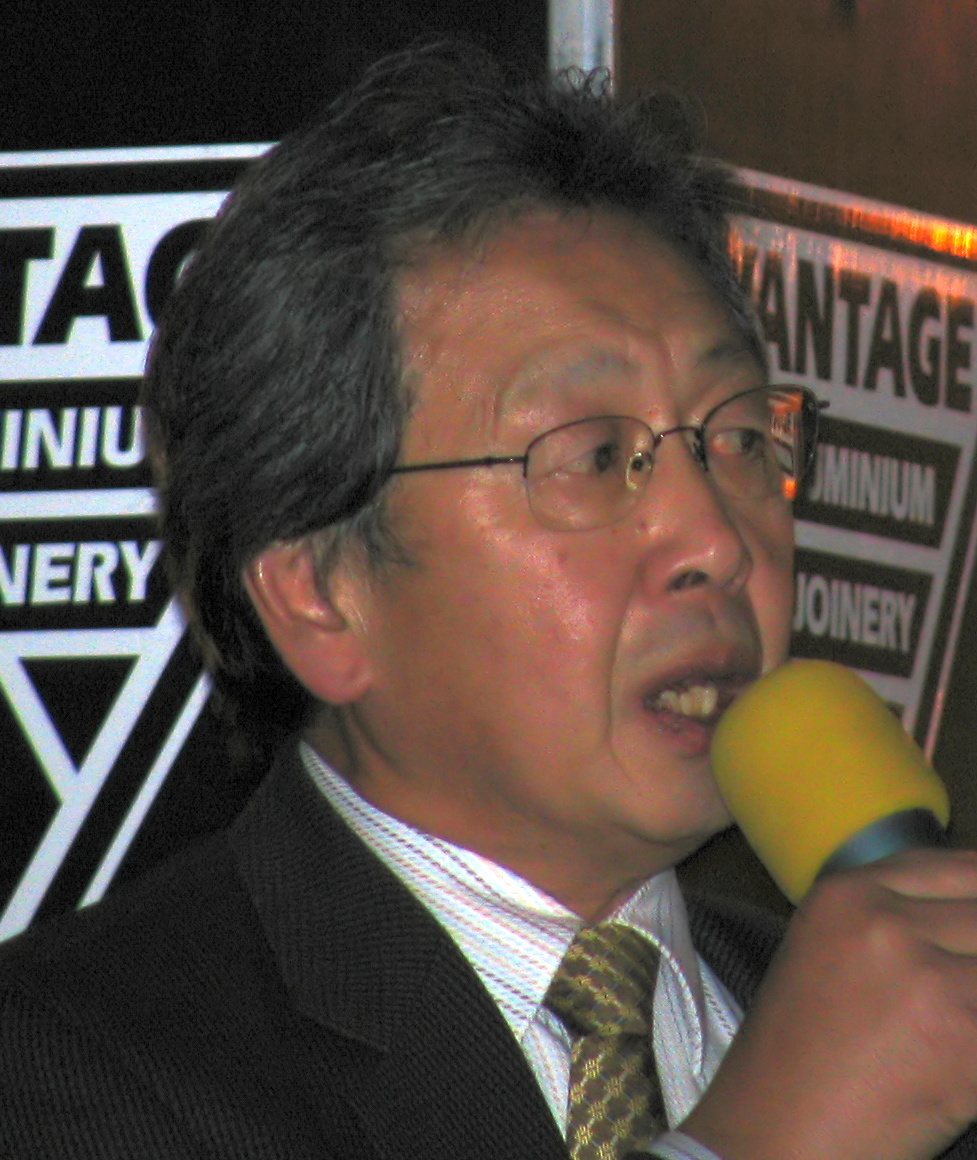

Candidate	Peter Chin	Lee Vandervis
Party	Independent	Independent
Popular vote	21,412	6,825
Percentage	53.4%	17.0%
Mayor before election
Peter Chin
Elected mayor
Peter Chin

The 2007 Dunedin mayoral election re-elected Peter Chin as mayor of Dunedin, New Zealand. The election was conducted under the Single transferable vote voting system.

== Results ==
The following table shows the detailed results for the 13 October 2007 election:

2007 Dunedin mayoral election
Party	Candidate	Votes	%	±%
Independent	Peter Chin	21,412	53.4	+10.0
Independent	Lee Vandervis	6,825	17.0	+13.9
Independent	Glenda Alexander	3,615	9.0	
Green	Fliss Butcher	2,966	7.4	
Independent	Olivier Lequeux	1,977	4.9	
Independent	Nicola Holman	1,124	2.8	
Workers Party	Tim Bowron	896	2.2	
Independent	Tracey Crampton-Smith	837	2.0	
Independent	Tim Couch	335	0.8	
Independent	Jimmy Knowles	149	0.4	−0.0
