= Dave Cull =

New Zealand politician (1950–2021)

Dave Cull CNZM JP
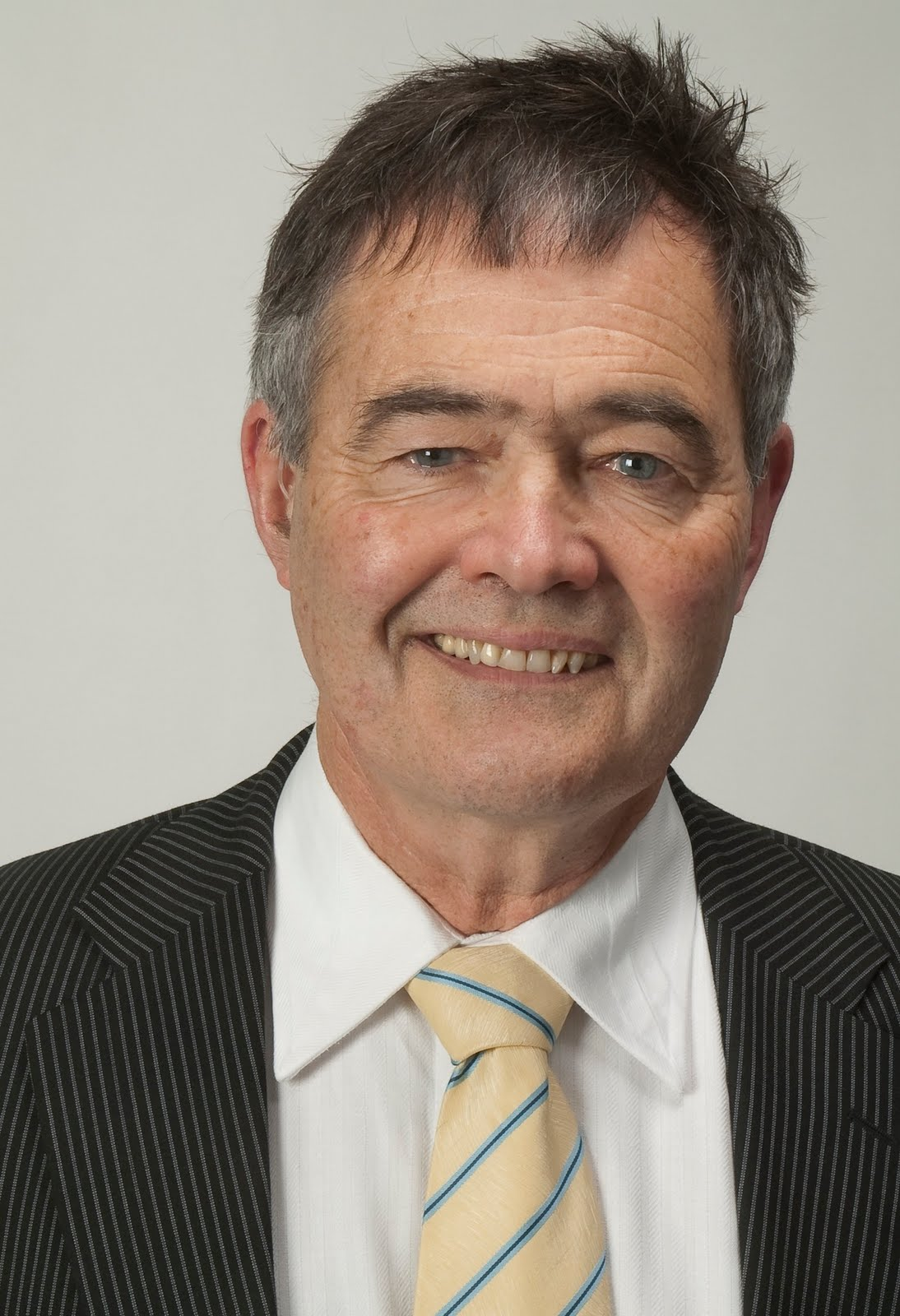
- Cull in 2010

57th Mayor of Dunedin
- In office 27 October 2010 – 18 October 2019
- Preceded by: Peter Chin
- Succeeded by: Aaron Hawkins

Personal details
- Born: 1 April 1950 Invercargill, New Zealand
- Died: 27 April 2021 (aged 71)
- Party: Greater Dunedin (2007–2016)
- Spouse: Joan Wilson
- Children: 2
- Profession: writer, broadcaster

David Charles Cull CNZM JP (1 April 1950 – 27 April 2021) was the mayor of the city of Dunedin in New Zealand. He became the 57th Mayor of Dunedin in October 2010 and was re-elected in both the 2013 mayoralty race and 2016 mayoral election. Before politics, he was a presenter for Television New Zealand and an author.

== Early life and career before politics ==
Cull was born and grew up in Invercargill, where he attended Southland Boys' High School. He obtained a BA and PG Dip in political science at the University of Otago.

He had worked as a television presenter for Television New Zealand, hosting lifestyle and home improvement shows including Home Front, and was a writer who had published several books.

He was married to Joan Wilson, with whom he had two daughters.

== Political career ==
David Cull was elected to the Dunedin City Council in 2007. During his time as a councillor, he opposed the new stadium, which has since become a financial drain on the council. In the 2010 Dunedin mayoral election, he was one of seven candidates, one of whom was incumbent mayor Peter Chin. Cull stood as part of the Greater Dunedin group and was successful. He took office as mayor on 27 October 2010.

Cull expressed support for a controversial planned waterfront hotel that at 28 storeys, would tower over much of the city. In March 2014, Cull entered a memorandum of understanding with the developer on behalf of Dunedin City Council, but the agreement fell over and was terminated a month later, which meant the end of the project.

In January 2013, Cull announced that he would seek re-election in that year's mayoral election. On election day, he beat ex ACT MP Hilary Calvert, Councillor Lee Vandervis, and six other challengers.

In December 2015, Cull was involved in a heated exchange with Councillor Vandervis, who alleged that Cull had paid a bribe to secure a Council contract in the 1980s. Vandevis subsequently filed a defamation suit seeking NZ$250,000 in general damages and NZ$250,000 in exemplary damages plus legal costs, alleging that Cull had defamed him when responding to that claim. In July 2017, Vandervis settled the lawsuit out of court due to legal delays and spiraling costs but declined to apologise to Cull.

In July 2017, Cull was elected as the president of Local Government New Zealand. He had previously served as the organisation's vice-president and chair of its metro committee.

In late May 2019, Cull announced he would not seek re-election at that year's mayoral election. In mid August 2019, Cull announced that he would be contesting local body elections for the Southern District Health Board; he was elected, and then appointed the Board's Chair in December 2019.

== Death ==
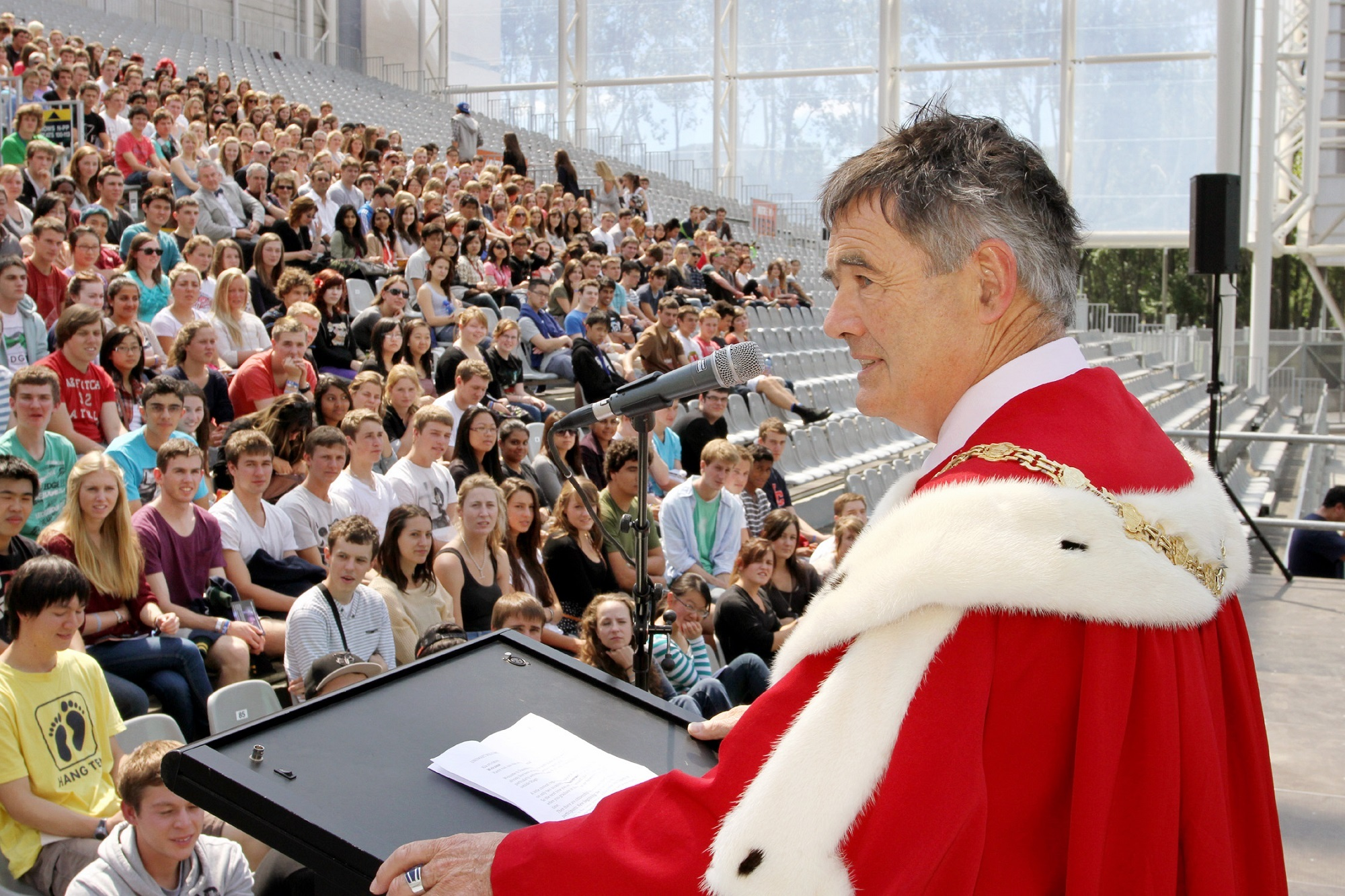
Cull in 2012, speaking at a University of Otago orientation event at Forsyth Barr Stadium

Cull was diagnosed with pancreatic cancer in October 2020. After undergoing chemotherapy treatment and spending several weeks in hospital, he died at his home on 27 April 2021, aged 71.

In the 2021 Queen's Birthday Honours, Cull was appointed a Companion of the New Zealand Order of Merit, for services to local government. The award had been approved by the Queen before Cull's death.

== Bibliography ==
- Cull, Dave (1998). New Zealand Backyard DIY Projects. Hyndman Publishing.
- Cull, Dave (2000). You Can Paint It!: Techniques and Tips. Hyndman Publishing.
- Cull, Dave (2000). Kitchen Essentials. Hyndman Publishing.
- Cull, Dave; Jaquiery, Stephen (2007). Icebergs: The Antarctic Comes to Town. Dunedin: Longacre Press.
- Cull, Dave (2009). Big Weather South. Dunedin: Longacre Press.

Political offices
Preceded by Peter Chin	Mayor of Dunedin; 2010–2019	Succeeded by Aaron Hawkins
