= Neil Collins (broadcaster) =

New Zealand politician and broadcaster (1941–2018)

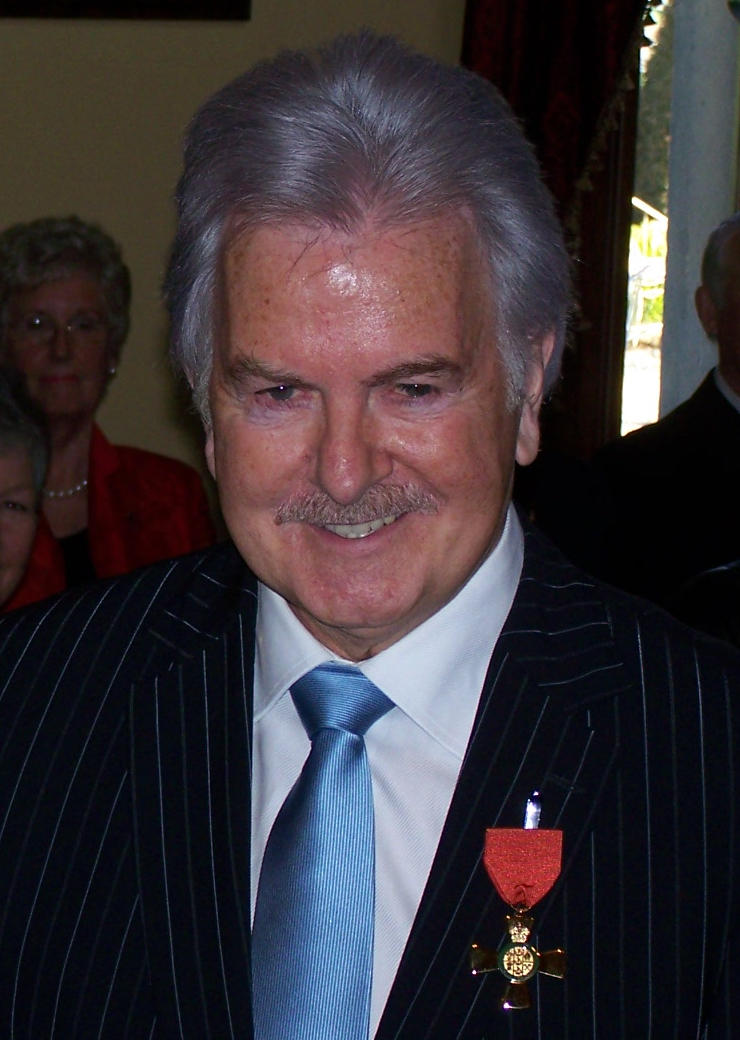
Collins in 2009

Neil Cornelius Adrian Collins ONZM QSM (5 March 1941 – 19 November 2018) was a New Zealand local-body politician and broadcaster.

== Broadcasting ==
Collins was a radio host in the southern city of Dunedin for over 50 years, with his final station being Radio Dunedin.

=== Brush with celebrity questioned ===
Collins claimed in a newspaper article in 2011 to have met actor Loretta Swit, the Beatles, and Bill Cosby, and provided a photo depicting himself posing alongside Cash. The student magazine Critic-Te Arohi pointed out that Cash's likeness in the photo "bears more than a passing resemblance to the album cover of The Best of Johnny Cash, Volume 2," concluding that the photo "...was so fantastic that Cash decided to use it for the album cover..."

== Local-body politics ==
Collins was a city councillor in Dunedin from 1989 until his retirement in 2013.

In the 1990 Queen's Birthday Honours, Collins was awarded the Queens Service Medal for community service. He was appointed an Officer of the New Zealand Order of Merit, for services to broadcasting, local-body affairs and the community, in the 2009 New Years Honours.

Collins died in Dunedin on 19 November 2018 after an illness.

== See also ==
- List of New Zealand television personalities
