= Richard Walls =

New Zealand politician

Richard Walls QSO JP
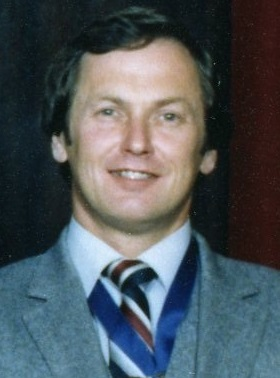
- Walls c. 1980

52nd Mayor of Dunedin
- In office 14 October 1989 – 14 October 1995
- Preceded by: Cliff Skeggs
- Succeeded by: Sukhi Turner

Member of the New Zealand Parliament for Dunedin North
- In office 29 November 1975 – 25 November 1978
- Preceded by: Ethel McMillan
- Succeeded by: Stan Rodger

Personal details
- Born: Richard Francis Walls; 9 October 1937 Dunedin, New Zealand
- Died: 30 October 2011 (aged 74) Dunedin, New Zealand
- Party: National
- Spouse: June Walls
- Children: 3

Richard Francis Walls QSO JP (9 October 1937 – 30 October 2011) was a New Zealand politician and businessman.

== Member of Parliament ==
New Zealand Parliament
Years	Term	Electorate	Party
1975–78	38th	Dunedin North	National

Walls was a Member of Parliament for Dunedin North from 1975 to 1978. A member of the National Party, he won the normally safe Labour seat as part of Robert Muldoon's landslide victory of 1975. He was the first National MP to represent a significant portion of Dunedin, a long-standing Labour stronghold, in 21 years. Walls was defeated after only one term by Labour's Stan Rodger; to date, he is the last National MP to represent Dunedin.

Following his defeat, Walls attempted to re-enter parliament by seeking the National nomination for the Auckland seat of East Coast Bays in a 1980 by-election. He made the initial five person shortlist, but after being hospitalised suddenly, he was too ill to travel to Auckland for the selection meeting.

== Local-body politics ==
Walls was first elected onto Dunedin City Council in 1980. Prior to that he served on the St. Kilda Borough Council (1962–1965) and on the Otago Harbour Board (1965–1974; Chairman 1971–1973). He was Mayor of Dunedin for two terms from 1989 to 1995, when he was defeated by Sukhi Turner. He was re-elected to the Dunedin City Council as a councillor in 1998. He remained a city councillor until 2010 and was chair of the Finance and Strategy Committee from 2007 to 2010. In the 2010 Dunedin local elections, he stood in the Central ward, but was unsuccessful.

== Outside politics ==
In 2010 Walls was chairman of Dunedin International Airport Limited; a fellow of the Institute of Directors in New Zealand (FInstD) and a fellow of the New Zealand Institute of Management (FNZIM). He was a justice of the peace and was appointed a Companion of the Queen's Service Order for public services in the 1996 Queen's Birthday Honours.

He died suddenly in his Dunedin home on 30 October 2011 at the age of 74, and is survived by his wife June and three children.

New Zealand Parliament
Preceded by Ethel McMillan	Member of Parliament for Dunedin North; 1975–1978	Succeeded by Stan Rodger
Political offices
Preceded by Cliff Skeggs	Mayor of Dunedin; 1989–1995	Succeeded by Sukhi Turner
