= Sukhi Turner =

New Zealand politician

Dame Sukhi Turner DNZM
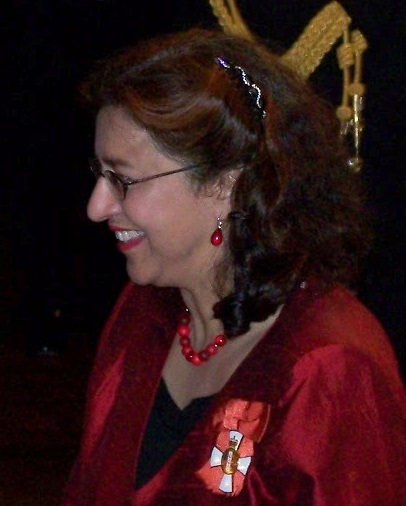
- Turner in 2009

55th Mayor of Dunedin
- In office 1995–2004
- Preceded by: Richard Walls
- Succeeded by: Peter Chin

Personal details
- Born: Sukhinder Kaur Gill; 13 April 1952 (age 74) Ludhiana, India
- Party: Green
- Spouse: Glenn Turner (m. 1973)
- Children: 2
- Relatives: Brian Turner (brother-in-law); Greg Turner (brother-in-law)

Dame Sukhinder Kaur Gill Turner DNZM (born Sukhinder Kaur Gill, 13 April 1952), commonly known as Sukhi Turner, is a New Zealand politician who served as the Mayor of Dunedin, New Zealand, from 1995 until her retirement from the position in 2004. She was also regarded by some as New Zealand's most prominent politician from the country's Indian community.

== Early life ==
Turner was born in Ludhiana, the largest city in the Indian state of Punjab, to Squadron Leader Jasbir Singh Gill and Premjit Kaur on 13 April 1952.

Born as Sukhinder Kaur Gill, she is a Sikh. She attended Bethany College, West Virginia, United States, gaining qualifications in history and political science. She moved to New Zealand after marrying Glenn Turner, a prominent New Zealand cricket player, in July 1973 at a ceremony in London, and became a naturalised New Zealander in August 1973. Sukhi and Glenn Turner settled in Dunedin in 1982. They have two children.

== Political career ==
Turner has taken part in a wide range of community work, focusing particularly on education. She has taken an active role in school committees and associations, and in 1992, successfully stood for election to the Dunedin City Council. After a three-year term on the council, Turner chose to contest the mayoralty, challenging long-serving incumbent Richard Walls. She was successful, and was subsequently re-elected twice. Her win over sitting mayor Richard Walls was reported on widely and she was noted for bringing diversity to the mayoralty, with Wellington newspaper The Evening Post stating of Turner "Dunedin voters broke new ground. Their new mayor is a woman, an Indian and a Green." Turner's election elicited a significant number of firsts for the mayoralty, becoming the first woman to be elected to the mayoralty along with being the youngest ever mayor and first non European to be appointed to the role.

Turner announced that she would retire from the position in October 2004, when her third term expired. She was replaced by Peter Chin. Turner was the first person of Indian origin to become a three time Mayer of Dunedin during her stint from 1995-2004.

In 1993, Turner was awarded the New Zealand Suffrage Centennial Medal.

== Life after politics ==
In the 2002 Queen's Birthday and Golden Jubilee Honours, Turner was appointed a Distinguished Companion of the New Zealand Order of Merit, for services to local government. Following the reinstatement of titular honours by the New Zealand government in 2009, she accepted redesignation as a Dame Companion of the New Zealand Order of Merit.

In early 2004, Turner was among the recipients of the Pravasi Bharatiya Samman, an award given by the Indian government to honour those who have made a significant contribution to Indian immigrant communities in other countries.

In 2017, Turner was the subject of a dangerous driving complaint to 555 following a call from a driver claiming she had repeatedly crossed the center line for which she was fined. Her husband Glenn Turner later claimed this was a result of the officer believing she was a foreigner.

Turner shares operates a touring business with her husband former black cap Glenn Turner.

Political offices
Preceded by Richard Walls	Mayor of Dunedin; 1995–2004	Succeeded by Peter Chin
