= 2025 New Zealand electoral calendar =

2025 elections in New Zealand

This is a list of elections that were held in New Zealand and associated states and territories in 2025. Included are any local or national elections or by-elections, as well as elections to iwi governing bodies, and any party leadership votes.

== Overview of key electoral events ==
=== Parliamentary by-elections ===
Date	Electorate	MP before	MP after
6 September	Tāmaki Makaurau	Takutai Tarsh Kemp (TPM)	Oriini Kaipara (TPM)

=== Party leadership votes ===
Date	Party	Role	Person before	Person after	Support	Voters
9–10 August	Green	Co-leaders	Marama Davidson	Marama Davidson	>75%	Green local branch delegates
9–10 August	Green	Co-leaders	Chlöe Swarbrick	Chlöe Swarbrick	>75%	Green local branch delegates
17 September	NZ First	Deputy	Vacant	Shane Jones	8 / 8	NZ First MPs
16 November	TOP	Leader	Vacant	Qiulae Wong	?	TOP board members

=== Local elections ===
==== Territorial authorities representing over 100k people ====
Date	Council	Council control before	Mayor before	Council control after	Mayor after
11 October	Auckland	No majority	Wayne Brown	No majority	Wayne Brown (Fix AKL)
11 October	Christchurch	No majority	Phil Mauger	No majority	Phil Mauger
11 October	Wellington	No majority	Tory Whanau (GRN)	No majority	Andrew Little (LAB)
11 October	Hamilton	No majority	Paula Southgate	No majority	Tim Macindoe
11 October	Dunedin	No majority	Jules Radich	No majority	Sophie Barker
11 October	Lower Hutt	No majority	Campbell Barry (LAB)	No majority	Ken Laban
11 October	Whangārei	No majority	Vince Cocurullo	No majority	Ken Couper

==== Regional councils representing over 100k people ====
Date	Council	Council control before	Council control after
11 October	Canterbury	No majority	No majority
11 October	Greater Wellington	No majority	No majority
11 October	Waikato	No majority	No majority
11 October	Bay of Plenty	No majority	No majority
11 October	Horizons	No majority	No majority
11 October	Otago	No majority	No majority
11 October	Northland	No majority	No majority
11 October	Hawke's Bay	No majority	No majority
11 October	Taranaki	No majority	No majority
11 October	Southland	No majority	No majority

=== Local referendums ===
Date	Jurisdiction	Subject	For	%	Against	%	Result
11 October	Various	Māori wards	542,134	50.25	467,923	43.37	18 councils for; 24 councils against
11 October	Lower Hutt	Amalgamation	17,429	54.96	14,283	45.04	Pro-amalgamation
11 October	Porirua	Amalgamation	9,581	56.43	7,399	43.57	Pro-amalgamation

=== Iwi elections ===
Date	Iwi	Role	Person before	Person after	Support	Voters
24 April	Ngāti Kahungunu	Chair	Bayden Barber	Bayden Barber	62%	Iwi members

== April to June ==
- 24 April: Ngāti Kahungunu iwi elections
- 29 April: Tauranga City Council by-election in the Māori ward
- 27 May: Mangaia mayoral by-election

== July to September ==
- 9–10 August: Confirmation vote of Green Party co-leaders held at their AGM per party constitution
- 6 September: Tāmaki Makaurau by-election
- 17 September: New Zealand First caucus selects Shane Jones as deputy party leader.

== October to December ==
- 11 October:
  - New Zealand local elections
  - New Zealand local referendums on Māori wards and constituencies
- 16 November: The Opportunities Party board select Qiulae Wong as the party's new leader

== See also ==
- 2025 in New Zealand
