= Results of the 2025 New Zealand regional council elections =

Election in New Zealand

2025 New Zealand regional council elections
- 11 October 2025
- Turnout: 895,761 (43.93% ▲0.84 pp)
- 11 regional councils
Party	Councils	+/–
No majority	11	0
This lists parties that won seats. See the complete results below.
- 132 regional councillors
Party	Seats	+/–
Independent	108	−12
Rates Control	7	+7
Green	4	−3
People's Choice	3	+1
Vision Otago	3	+3
Labour	2	+1
Te Pāti Māori	2	+1
ACT Local	2	+2
Reform	1	+1
This lists parties that won seats. See the complete results below.

Elections for the regional councils of New Zealand were held from 9 September to 11 October 2025 as part of that year's nation-wide local elections. 132 regional councillors were elected across all 11 regions.

The vast majority of elected councillors (109) were independents. National-level political parties and aligned-tickets won 12 seats whilst local tickets won 11.

== Summary ==
=== Overall ===
Council	Electoral system	Seats	Chair	Councillors	Control	Turnout	Details	Refs
Northland	FPP	9	▌ Independent gain	▌ Independent 8 ( 0) ▌ Te Pāti Māori 1 (▲1)	▌ No majority	58,978; 49.30% ▲6.84 pp	Details	
Waikato	FPP	14	▌ Rates Control gain	▌ Rates Control 7 (▲7) ▌ Independent 7 (▼7)	▌ No majority	80,767; 34.73% ▼1.89 pp	Details	
Bay of Plenty	FPP	14	▌ Independent gain	▌ Independent 13 (▲1) ▌ Independent Green 1 ( 0)	▌ No majority	80,767; 34.73% ▼1.89 pp	Details	
Hawke's Bay	FPP	11	▌ Independent gain	▌ Independent 11 ( 0)	▌ No majority	53,561; 49.01% ▲9.85 pp	Details	
Taranaki	FPP	11	▌ Independent hold	▌ Independent 11 ( 0)	▌ No majority	37,759; 47.63% ▲3.08 pp	Details	
Horizons (Manawatū-Whanganui)	FPP	14	▌ Independent gain	▌ Independent 13 ( 0) ▌ Te Pāti Māori 1 (▲1)	▌ No majority	73,713; 46.82% ▲3.35 pp	Details	
Greater Wellington	STV	14	▌ Labour hold	▌ Independent 9 ( 0) ▌ Labour 2 (▲1) ▌ Green 2 (▼1) ▌ ACT Local 1 (▲1)	▌ No majority	161,396; 47.58% ▲4.17 pp	Details	
West Coast	FPP	7	▌ Independent gain	▌ Independent 6 (▼1) ▌ Reform 1 (▲1)	▌ No majority	12,546; 52.37% ▲0.19 pp	Details	
Canterbury	FPP	14	▌ Independent gain	▌ Independent 11 (▼1) ▌ People's Choice 3 (▲1)	▌ No majority	192,854; 41.61% ▼3.76 pp	Details	
Otago	STV	12	▌ Vision Otago gain	▌ Independent 7 (▼4) ▌ Vision Otago 3 (▲3) ▌ Green 1 ( 1) ▌ ACT Local 1 (▲1)	▌ No majority	80,530; 47.10% ▼1.72 pp	Details	
Southland	FPP	12	▌ Independent gain	▌ Independent 12 ( 0)	▌ No majority	20,794; 46.11% ▼5.82 pp	Details	
11 of 11 councils		132						

== Northland Regional Council ==
2025 Northland Regional Council election
- 11 October 2025
- Turnout: 58,978 (49.30% ▲6.84 pp)
- 9 seats on the governing body of Northland Regional Council; 5 seats needed for a majority
Party	Seats	+/–
Independent	8	0
Te Pāti Māori	1	+1
This lists parties that won seats. See the complete results below.
Control before	Control after
No majority	No majority

Chair election
- 5 November 2025

5 of 9 votes needed for majority
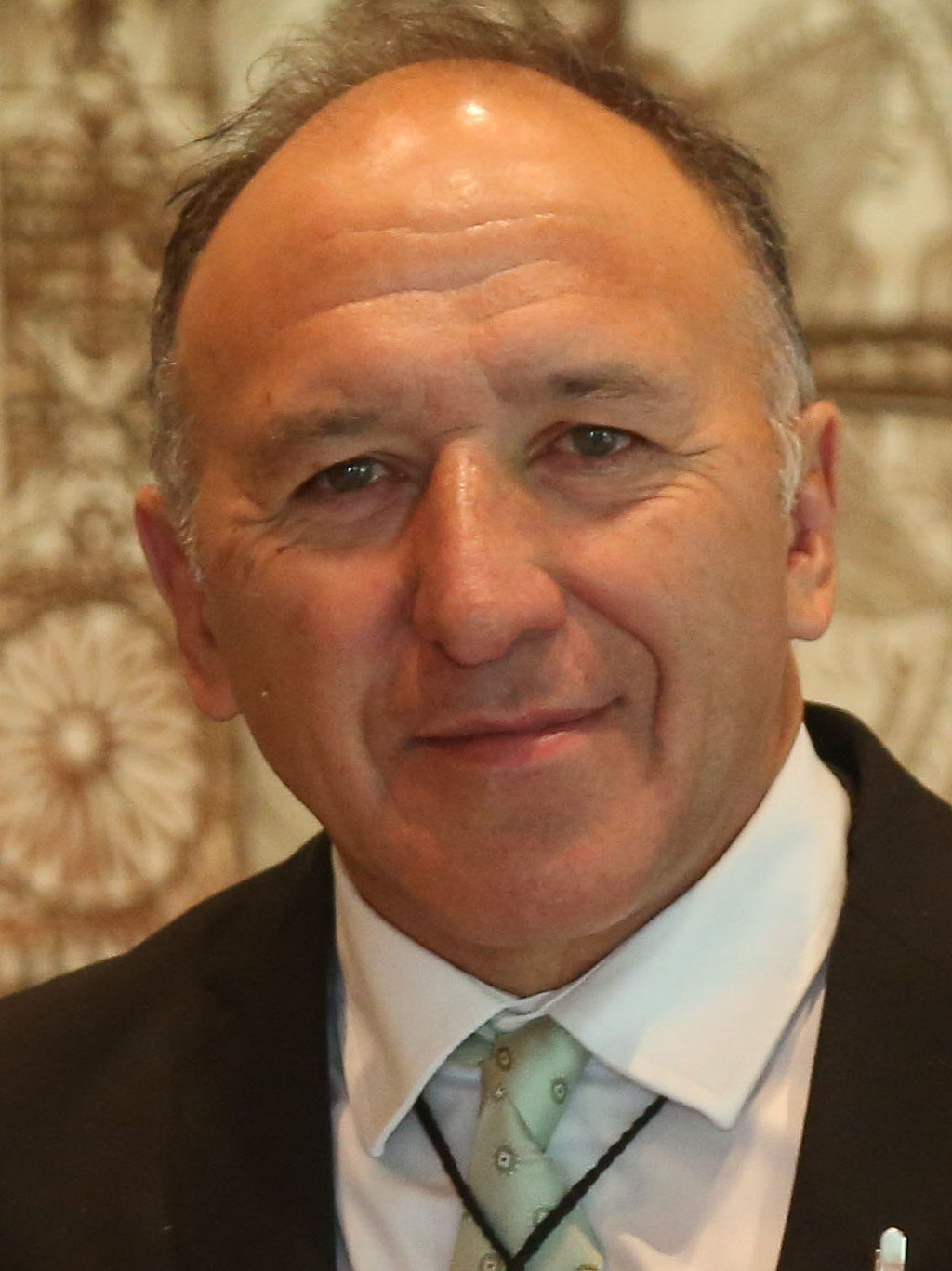
		Ind
Candidate	Pita Tipene	Geoff Crawford
Party	Independent	Independent
Electoral vote	5: Craw; Kitchen; Macdonald; Morunga; Tipene	3: Blackwell; Crawford; Hunt
Chair before election
Geoff Crawford
Independent
Elected Chair
Pita Tipene
Independent

=== Far North general constituency ===
2025 Far North general constituency election
Party	Candidate	Votes	%	±%
Independent	Joe Carr^{†}	3,660	45.84	+9.26
Independent	Marty Yuretich	2,012	25.20	+1.68
Independent	Reina Tuai Penney	1,279	16.02	(new)
Informal votes		627	7.85	+3.10
Blank votes		407	5.10	+0.01
Turnout		7,985	51.19	+5.90
Registered electors		15,600		
Independent hold				
^{†} incumbent

=== Bay of Islands-Whangaroa general constituency ===
2025 Bay of Islands-Whangaroa general constituency election
Party	Candidate	Votes	%	±%
Independent	Colin Toss Kitchen	1,972	22.64	(new)
Independent	Lane Ayr	1,354	15.55	(new)
Independent	Jane Wright	1,264	14.51	(new)
Independent	Murray Hosking	1,243	14.27	(new)
Independent	Nyze Manuel	998	11.46	(new)
Independent	Karl Barkley	677	7.77	(new)
Informal votes		489	5.61	+0.91
Blank votes		713	8.19	+3.07
Turnout		8,710	54.19	+7.99
Registered electors		16,074		
Independent gain from Independent				

=== Mid North general constituency ===
2025 Mid North general constituency election
Party	Candidate	Votes	%	±%
Independent	Geoff Crawford^{†}	elected unopposed		
Registered electors		14,079		
Independent hold				
^{†} incumbent

=== Coastal Central general constituency ===
2025 Coastal Central general constituency election
Party	Candidate	Votes	%	±%
Independent	Amy Macdonald^{†}	4,480	56.03	+0.48
Independent	Greg Chalmers	2,906	36.34	(new)
Informal votes		118	1.48	+1.29
Blank votes		492	6.15	+0.08
Turnout		7,996	53.04	+1.81
Registered electors		15,076		
Independent hold				
^{†} incumbent

=== Kaipara general constituency ===
2025 Kaipara general constituency election
Party	Candidate	Votes	%	±%
Independent	John Wallace Blackwell^{†}	5,579	70.27	+21.84
Independent	Lorraine Norris	1,779	22.41	(new)
Informal votes		44	0.55	−0.25
Blank votes		537	6.76	+0.95
Turnout		7,939	56.64	+9.44
Registered electors		14,016		
Independent hold				
^{†} incumbent

=== Whangārei Central general constituency ===
2025 Whangārei Central general constituency election
Party	Candidate	Votes	%	±%
Independent	Jack Craw^{†}	2,982	47.19	−14.95
Independent	Caroline Davis	2,755	43.60	(new)
Informal votes		78	1.23	+1.14
Blank votes		504	7.98	−6.01
Turnout		6,319	41.59	−0.43
Registered electors		15,193		
Independent hold				
^{†} incumbent

=== Coastal South general constituency ===
2025 Coastal South general constituency election
Party	Candidate	Votes	%	±%
Independent	John Hunt	3,197	38.52	(new)
Independent	Rick Stolwerk^{†}	2,656	32.00	n/a
Independent	Robert Goodhue	1,655	19.94	(new)
Informal votes		185	2.23	n/a
Blank votes		607	7.31	n/a
Turnout		8,300	50.20	n/a
Registered electors		16,535		
Independent gain from Independent				
^{†} incumbent

=== Te Raki Māori constituency ===
2025 Te Raki Māori constituency election
Party	Candidate	Votes	%	±%
Independent	Pita Tipene	6,515	55.55	(new)
Te Pāti Māori	Arama Morunga	5,297	45.16	(new)
Independent	Peter-Lucas Jones^{†}	3,882	33.10	−16.78
Independent	Tui Shortland^{†}	3,655	31.16	−37.10
Informal votes		582	4.96	+3.20
Blank votes		315	2.69	−1.32
Turnout		11,729	43.22	+14.58
Registered electors		27,140		
Independent gain from Independent Green				
Te Pāti Māori gain from Independent				
^{†} incumbent

=== Referendum on Māori constituencies ===
Referendum on Māori constituencies
Choice	Votes	%
I vote to REMOVE Māori constituencies	31,539	48.02
I vote to KEEP Māori constituencies	30,878	47.01
Informal	38	0.06
Blank	3,226	4.91
Turnout	65,681	(48.59)
Registered	135,165	
Result:	Māori constituencies to be abolished at next election.	

=== Chair election ===
Pita Tipene (Independent) defeated incumbent Geoff Crawford (Independent) 5-to-3; councillor Carr abstained from voting.

== Waikato Regional Council ==
2025 Waikato Regional Council election
- 11 October 2025
- Turnout: 122,557 (41.20% ▲2.53 pp)
- 14 seats on the governing body of Waikato Regional Council; 8 seats needed for a majority
Party	Seats	+/–
Rates Control	7	+7
Independent	7	−7
This lists parties that won seats. See the complete results below.
Control before	Control after
No majority	No majority

Chair election
- 29 October 2025

8 of 14 votes needed for majority
	RCT
Candidate	Warren Maher
Party	Rates Control
Electoral vote	Unopposed
Chair before election
Pamela Storey
Independent
Elected Chair
Warren Maher
Rates Control

=== Waikato general constituency ===
2025 Waikato general constituency election
Party	Candidate	Votes	%	±%
Rates Control	Gary McGuire	10,205	58.58	(new)
Independent	Noel Smith^{†}	8,174	46.92	−0.42
Independent	Pamela Storey^{†}	7,011	40.24	−6.62
Independent	Rhys Craig	3,048	17.50	(new)
Informal votes		21	0.12	+0.08
Blank votes		807	4.63	−2.12
Turnout		17,421	35.09	+1.85
Registered electors		49,649		
Rates Control gain from Independent				
Independent hold				
^{†} incumbent

=== Hamilton general constituency ===
2025 Hamilton general constituency election
Party	Candidate	Votes	%	±%
Independent	Angela Strange^{†}	15,781	46.62	−13.09
Rates Control	Chris Hughes^{†}	14,013	41.40	−2.28
Rates Control	Ben Dunbar-Smith	13,640	40.30	(new)
Independent	Jennifer Nickel^{†}	11,873	35.08	−10.76
Independent	Bruce Clarkson^{†}	10,717	31.66	−17.23
Independent	Robin Ratcliffe	10,071	29.75	(new)
Independent	Bala Tikkisetty	7,343	21.69	(new)
Independent	Henry Penny	6,263	18.50	(new)
Independent	Pam Chiles	4,734	13.99	(new)
Independent	Phillip Westwood	2,488	7.35	(new)
Informal votes		267	0.79	+0.12
Blank votes		2,838	8.38	+3.35
Turnout		33,850	33.82	+2.45
Registered electors		100,084		
Independent hold				
Rates Control hold				
Rates Control gain from Independent				
Independent hold				
^{†} incumbent

=== Waipā-King Country general constituency ===
2025 Waipā-King Country general constituency election
Party	Candidate	Votes	%	±%
Rates Control	Garry Reymer	10,177	48.41	(new)
Independent	Liz Stolwyk	9,392	44.68	(new)
Independent	Stu Kneebone^{†}	9,299	44.23	−7.37
Rates Control	Clyde Graf^{†}	6,042	28.74	−13.54
Informal votes		31	0.15	−0.26
Blank votes		1,164	5.54	−0.85
Turnout		21,022	43.83	+1.25
Registered electors		47,963		
Rates Control gain from Independent				
Independent gain from Independent				
^{†} incumbent

=== Thames-Coromandel general constituency ===
2025 Thames-Coromandel general constituency election
Party	Candidate	Votes	%	±%
Rates Control	Warren Maher^{†}	8,847	62.99	+17.12
Independent	Jason Roxburgh	3,621	25.78	(new)
Informal votes		19	0.14	+0.11
Blank votes		1,270	9.04	−2.06
Turnout		14,045	49.53	−0.71
Registered electors		28,359		
Rates Control gain from Independent				
^{†} incumbent

=== Waihou general constituency ===
2025 Waihou general constituency election
Party	Candidate	Votes	%	±%
Rates Control	Robert Cookson^{†}	11,061	51.81	−18.68
Independent	Keith Holmes	9,675	45.32	(new)
Independent	Walt Cavendish	6,181	28.95	(new)
Independent	Julie Taylor	5,168	24.21	(new)
Independent	Lindsay Algra	2,002	9.38	(new)
Informal votes		112	0.52	−1.25
Blank votes		2,110	9.88	−11.58
Turnout		21,350	46.86	+2.26
Registered electors		45,566		
Rates Control gain from Independent				
Independent gain from Independent				
^{†} incumbent

=== Taupō-Rotorua general constituency ===
2025 Taupō-Rotorua general constituency election
Party	Candidate	Votes	%	±%
Rates Control	Mich'eal Downard^{†}	7,974	53.63	+4.29
Independent	Deb Mair	2,766	18.60	(new)
Independent	Debbie Davies	2,267	15.25	(new)
Informal votes		17	0.11	+0.01
Blank votes		1,710	11.50	−1.99
Turnout		14,869	57.51	+6.77
Registered electors		25,854		
Rates Control gain from Independent				
^{†} incumbent

=== Ngā Hau e Whā Māori constituency ===
2025 Ngā Hau e Whā Māori constituency election
Party	Candidate	Votes	%	±%
Independent	Tipa Mahuta^{†}	elected unopposed		
Registered electors		23,789		
Independent hold				
^{†} incumbent

=== Ngā Tai ki Uta Māori constituency ===
2025 Ngā Tai Ki Uta Māori constituency election
Party	Candidate	Votes	%	±%
Independent	Kataraina Hodge^{†}	elected unopposed		
Registered electors		15,181		
Independent hold				
^{†} incumbent

=== Chair election ===
Warren Maher (Rates Control Team) was elected unopposed.

== Bay of Plenty Regional Council ==
2025 Bay of Plenty Regional Council election
- 11 October 2025
- Turnout: 80,767 (34.73 ▼1.89 pp)
- 14 seats on the governing body of Bay of Plenty Regional Council; 8 seats needed for a majority
Party	Seats	+/–
Independent	13	+1
Independent Green	1	0
This lists parties that won seats. See the complete results below.
Control before	Control after
No majority	No majority

Chair election
- 30 October 2025

8 of 14 votes needed for majority
	Ind
Candidate	Matemoana McDonald
Party	Independent
Electoral vote	Unopposed
Chair before election
Doug Leeder
Independent
Elected Chair
Matemoana McDonald
Independent

=== Western Bay of Plenty general constituency ===
2025 Western Bay of Plenty general constituency election
Party	Candidate	Votes	%	±%
Independent	John Scrimgeour	6,441	46.52	(new)
Independent	Ken Shirley^{†}	6,104	44.09	−2.18
Independent	Neil Parker	4,735	34.20	(new)
Independent	Cathi Barker	3,665	26.47	(new)
Informal votes		36	0.26	+0.13
Blank votes		1,730	12.50	+4.62
Turnout		13,845	38.54	−0.21
Registered electors		35,925		
Independent gain from Independent				
Independent hold				
^{†} incumbent

=== Rotorua general constituency ===
2025 Rotorua general constituency election
Party	Candidate	Votes	%	±%
Independent	Raj Kumar	6,152	38.56	(new)
Independent	Anna Grayling (née Heap)	4,348	27.26	(new)
Independent	Lyall Thurston^{†}	3,891	24.39	−11.37
Independent	Tamati Coffey	3,680	23.07	(new)
Independent	Nick Chater	2,369	14.85	(new)
Independent	Brett Wilson	2,160	13.54	(new)
Independent	Roana Bennett	2,088	13.09	(new)
Independent	Rose Hiha-Agnew	1,289	8.08	(new)
Independent	Stuart McManaway	965	6.05	(new)
Independent	Jude Pani	759	4.76	(new)
Independent	Daryn Bean	667	4.18	(new)
Informal votes		54	0.34	+0.19
Blank votes		669	4.19	−1.96
Turnout		15,953	46.00	−6.78
Registered electors		34,683		
Independent gain from Independent				
Independent gain from Independent				
^{†} incumbent

=== Tauranga general constituency ===
2025 Tauranga general constituency election
Party	Candidate	Votes	%	±%
Independent	Stuart Crosby^{†}	10,612	43.26	−1.71
Independent	Tim Maltby	8,983	36.62	(new)
Independent	Glenn Dougal	8,348	34.03	(new)
Independent	Kate Graeme	8,056	32.84	(new)
Independent Green	Kate MacMillan^{†}	7,858	32.03	−0.23
Independent	Andrew Von Dadelszen^{†}	7,610	31.02	−2.03
Independent	Ron Scott^{†}	6,677	27.22	−12.89
Independent	Mark Wassung	5,995	24.44	−6.74
Independent	Ash Hillis	5,261	21.45	(new)
Independent	Murray Guy	5,093	20.76	−6.05
Independent	Douglas Owens	4,995	20.36	(new)
Independent	Annika Lane	4,640	18.91	(new)
Independent	Daniel Harvey	4,585	18.69	(new)
Independent	Vanessa Charman-Moore	4,173	17.01	(new)
Independent	Derek Stembridge	4,035	16.45	(new)
Independent	Shelley Archibald	3,550	14.47	(new)
Animal Justice	Caitlin Grattan	2,180	8.89	(new)
Independent	Clinton Naude	1,096	4.47	(new)
Informal votes		72	0.29	+0.07
Blank votes		36	0.15	+0.01
Turnout		24,531	25.03	−3.42
Registered electors		97,997		
Independent hold				
Independent gain from Independent				
Independent gain from Independent				
Independent gain from Independent				
Independent Green hold				
^{†} incumbent

=== Eastern Bay of Plenty general constituency ===
2025 Eastern Bay of Plenty general constituency election
Party	Candidate	Votes	%	±%
Independent	Malcolm Campbell^{†}	7,106	55.86	−8.01
Independent	Sarah Van Der Boom	6,498	51.08	+14.70
Independent	Adrian Gault	4,753	37.36	(new)
Independent	Jessica Sneha Gray	2,685	21.11	(new)
Informal votes		17	0.13	−0.02
Blank votes		621	4.88	+0.13
Turnout		12,721	51.36	−2.55
Registered electors		24,767		
Independent hold				
Independent gain from Independent				
^{†} incumbent

=== Kohi Māori constituency ===
2025 Kōhi Māori constituency election
Party	Candidate	Votes	%	±%
Independent	Mawera Karetai	1,585	29.97	(new)
Independent	Ngapera Rangiaho	1,491	28.20	(new)
Independent	Karamea (Chris) Insley	1,030	19.48	(new)
Independent	Jackie Te Amo-Te Kurapa	970	18.34	(new)
Informal votes		39	0.74	n/a
Blank votes		173	3.27	n/a
Turnout		5,288	42.62	n/a
Registered electors		12,407		
Independent gain from Te Pāti Māori				

=== Mauao Māori constituency ===
2025 Mauao Māori general constituency election
Party	Candidate	Votes	%	±%
Independent	Matemoana McDonald^{†}	1,378	39.79	−16.92
Independent	Ange Webster	984	28.41	(new)
Independent	Paora Stanley	973	28.10	(new)
Informal votes		2	0.06	−0.16
Blank votes		152	4.39	+1.56
Turnout		3,463	25.43	+5.89
Registered electors		13,619		
Independent hold				
^{†} incumbent

=== Ōkurei Māori constituency ===
2025 Ōkurei Māori constituency election
Party	Candidate	Votes	%	±%
Independent	Allan Iwi Te Whau	2,214	44.58	(new)
Independent	Cyrus Tauahika Hingston	1,638	32.98	(new)
Independent	Te Taru White^{†}	1,001	20.16	−25.14
Informal votes		5	0.10	+0.07
Blank votes		106	2.13	−6.94
Turnout		4,966	37.76	+4.63
Registered electors		13,153		
Independent gain from Independent				
^{†} incumbent

=== Chair election ===
Matemoana McDonald (Independent) was elected unopposed.

== Hawke's Bay Regional Council ==
2025 Hawke's Bay Regional Council election
- 11 October 2025
- Turnout: 53,561 (49.01% ▲9.85 pp)
- 11 seats on the governing body of Hawke's Bay Regional Council; 6 seats needed for a majority
Party	Seats	+/–
Independent	11	0
This lists parties that won seats. See the complete results below.
Control before	Control after
No majority	No majority

Chair election
- 29 October 2025

6 of 11 votes needed for majority
	Ind
Candidate	Sophie Siers
Party	Independent
Electoral vote	Unopposed
Chair before election
Hinewai Ormsby
Independent
Elected Chair
Sophie Siers
Independent

=== Wairoa general constituency ===
2025 Wairoa general constituency election
Party	Candidate	Votes	%	±%
Independent	Di Roadley^{†}	1,143	62.05	−1.77
Independent	Kiri Rangirangi-Hamlin	532	28.88	(new)
Informal votes		2	0.11	+0.11
Blank votes		152	8.25	+6.10
Turnout		1,842	59.34	+1.48
Registered electors		3,104		
Independent hold				
^{†} incumbent

=== Ahuriri/Napier general constituency ===
2025 Ahuriri/Napier general constituency election
Party	Candidate	Votes	%	±%
Independent	Neil Kirton^{†}	10,820	54.78	−14.68
Independent	Louise Parson	9,287	47.02	(new)
Independent	Hinewai Ormsby^{†}	8,676	43.92	−8.90
Independent	Hayley Browne	8,077	40.89	(new)
Independent	Paul Bailey	5,744	29.08	(new)
Independent	Syed Khurram Iqbal	4,763	24.11	(new)
Informal votes		17	0.09	+0.06
Blank votes		617	3.12	−0.57
Turnout		19,752	47.80	+5.10
Registered electors		41,326		
Independent hold				
Independent gain from Independent				
Independent hold				
^{†} incumbent

=== Heretaunga/Hastings general constituency ===
2025 Heretaunga/Hastings general constituency election
Party	Candidate	Votes	%	±%
Independent	Jock Mackintosh^{†}	9,534	60.08	+12.16
Independent	Sophie Siers^{†}	9,507	59.91	+14.97
Independent	Conrad Waitoa	7,459	47.00	(new)
Independent	Bruce Mackay	6,600	41.59	(new)
Informal votes		3	0.02	−0.09
Blank votes		1,376	8.67	+5.60
Turnout		15,869	45.36	+0.00
Registered electors		34,983		
Independent hold				
Independent hold				
Independent gain from Independent				
^{†} incumbent

=== Ngāruroro general constituency ===
2025 Ngāruroro general constituency election
Party	Candidate	Votes	%	±%
Independent	Jerf Van Beek^{†}	4,370	59.37	n/a
Independent	Marcus Ormond	2,579	35.04	(new)
Informal votes		0	0.00	n/a
Blank votes		411	5.58	n/a
Turnout		7,361	51.91	n/a
Registered electors		14,180		
Independent hold				
^{†} incumbent

=== Tamatea/Central Hawke's Bay general constituency ===
2025 Tamatea/Central Hawke's Bay general constituency election
Party	Candidate	Votes	%	±%
Independent	Tony Kuklinksi	2,197	39.18	(new)
Independent	Tim Aitken	2,189	39.03	(new)
Independent	Keri Ropiha	891	15.89	(new)
Informal votes		26	0.46	n/a
Blank votes		304	5.42	n/a
Turnout		5,608	58.46	n/a
Registered electors		9,593		
Independent gain from Independent				

=== Māui ki te Raki Māori constituency ===
2025 Māui ki te Raki Māori constituency election
Party	Candidate	Votes	%	±%
Independent	Michelle McIlroy (née Lewis)	1,898	60.66	+19.22
Independent	Shelton White	1,032	32.98	(new)
Informal votes		0	0.00	−0.11
Blank votes		196	6.26	−2.25
Turnout		3,129	51.25	+25.82
Registered electors		6,105		
Independent gain from Independent				

=== Māui ki te Tonga Māori constituency ===
2025 Māui ki te Tonga Māori constituency election
Party	Candidate	Votes	%	±%
Independent	Thompson Hokianga^{†}	elected unopposed		
Registered electors		9,928		
Independent hold				
^{†} incumbent

=== Referendum on Māori constituencies ===
Referendum on Māori constituencies
Choice	Votes	%
I vote to REMOVE Māori constituencies	28,193	49.20
I vote to KEEP Māori constituencies	24,447	42.66
Informal	5	0.01
Blank	4,662	8.14
Turnout	57,307	
Registered		
Result:	Māori constituencies to be abolished at next election.	

=== Chair election ===
Sophier Siers (Independent) was elected unopposed.

== Taranaki Regional Council ==
2025 Taranaki Regional Council election
- 11 October 2025
- Turnout: 37,759 (47.63% ▲3.08 pp)
- 11 seats on the governing body of Taranaki Regional Council; 6 seats needed for a majority
Party	Seats	+/–
Independent	11	0
This lists parties that won seats. See the complete results below.
Control before	Control after
No majority	No majority

Chair election
- 4 November 2025

6 of 11 votes needed for majority
	Ind
Candidate	Craig Williamson
Party	Independent
Electoral vote	Unopposed
Chair before election
Craig Williamson
Independent
Elected Chair
Craig Williamson
Independent

=== New Plymouth general constituency ===
2025 New Plymouth general constituency election
Party	Candidate	Votes	%	±%
Independent	Susan Hughes^{†}	10,751	53.06	+0.43
Independent	Craig Stuart Williamson^{†}	9,086	44.84	+3.94
Independent	Tom Cloke^{†}	9,074	44.78	−5.22
Independent	Jonathan Young	8,938	44.11	(new)
Independent	John Robert Maxwell	5,979	29.51	(new)
Independent	Rusty Kane	5,360	26.45	+9.45
Independent	Nicola Jane Ngarewa	5,144	25.39	(new)
Independent	Louise Mary James	4,865	24.01	(new)
Independent	Craig Foltz	4,045	19.96	(new)
Informal votes		185	0.91	−0.41
Blank votes		1,941	9.58	+2.34
Turnout		20,262	47.62	+0.83
Registered electors		42,547		
Independent hold				
Independent hold				
Independent hold				
Independent gain from Independent				
Independent gain from Independent				
^{†} incumbent

=== North Taranaki general constituency ===
2025 North Taranaki general constituency election
Party	Candidate	Votes	%	±%
Independent	Mike Davey^{†}	3,426	51.90	−13.79
Independent	Lee Kennedy	2,372	35.93	(new)
Independent	Leedom Gibbs	1,631	24.71	(new)
Independent	Tama Blackburn	1,516	22.97	−11.42
Independent	Chris Wilkes	1,309	19.83	(new)
Informal votes		183	2.77	+0.79
Blank votes		556	8.42	+1.78
Turnout		6,601	46.29	+1.43
Registered electors		14,261		
Independent hold				
Independent gain from Independent				
^{†} incumbent

=== Stratford general constituency ===
2025 Stratford general constituency election
Party	Candidate	Votes	%	±%
Independent	Alan Jamieson^{†}	1,738	49.61	+19.59
Independent	Brendan Attrill	1,586	45.28	(new)
Informal votes		4	0.11	−0.25
Blank votes		174	4.97	+2.94
Turnout		3,503	54.64	+16.44
Registered electors		6,411		
Independent hold				
^{†} incumbent

=== South Taranaki general constituency ===
2025 South Taranaki general constituency election
Party	Candidate	Votes	%	±%
Independent	Donna Maree Cram^{†}	4,946	66.90	+24.50
Independent	Neil Walker^{†}	4,630	62.63	+13.13
Independent	Urs Peter Signer	1,976	26.73	+11.53
Informal votes		4	0.05	−0.54
Blank votes		505	6.83	+2.59
Turnout		7,393	46.05	+5.08
Registered electors		16,055		
Independent hold				
Independent hold				
^{†} incumbent

=== Taranaki Māori constituency ===
2025 Taranaki Māori constituency election
Party	Candidate	Votes	%	±%
Independent	Bonita Bigham^{†}	elected unopposed		
Registered electors		7,739		
Independent hold				
^{†} incumbent

=== Referendum on Māori constituencies ===
Referendum on Māori constituencies
Choice	Votes	%
I vote to REMOVE Māori constituencies	21,095	51.89
I vote to KEEP Māori constituencies	16,721	41.13
Informal	16	0.04
Blank	2,821	6.94
Turnout	40,653	46.25
Registered	87,902	
Result:	Māori constituencies to be abolished at next election.	

=== Chair election ===
Craig Williamson (Independent) was elected unopposed.

== Horizons Regional Council ==
2025 Horizons Regional Council election
- 11 October 2025
- Turnout: 73,713 (46.82% ▲3.35 pp)
- 14 seats on the governing body of Horizons Regional Council; 8 seats needed for a majority
Party	Seats	+/–
Independent	13	0
Te Pāti Māori	1	+1
This lists parties that won seats. See the complete results below.
Control before	Control after
No majority	No majority

Chair election
- 29 October 2025

8 of 14 votes needed for majority
	Ind	Ind
Candidate	Nikki Riley	Bruce Gordon
Party	Independent	Independent
Electoral vote	8: Fraser; Pue; F Gordon; Eastonn; Jansen; Riley; Dryland; Teira	6: Taylor; B Gordon; McKellar; Naylor; Wells; Te Awe Awe
Chair before election
Rachel Keedwell
Independent
Elected Chair
Nikki Riley
Independent

=== Ruapehu general constituency ===
2025 Ruapehu general constituency election
Party	Candidate	Votes	%	±%
Independent	Nikki Riley^{†}	elected unopposed		
Registered electors		6,470		
Independent hold				
^{†} incumbent

=== Whanganui general constituency ===
2025 Whanganui general constituency election
Party	Candidate	Votes	%	±%
Independent	Alan Taylor^{†}	7,143	47.87	−1.93
Independent	Ben Fraser	6,171	41.36	(new)
Independent	Martin Visser	5,098	34.16	(new)
Independent	Phill Haynes	3,541	23.73	(new)
Informal votes		7	0.05	−0.02
Blank votes		2,037	13.65	+4.52
Turnout		14,922	52.03	+1.08
Registered electors		28,682		
Independent hold				
Independent gain from Independent				
^{†} incumbent

=== Manawatū-Rangitīkei general constituency ===
2025 Manawatū-Rangitīkei general constituency election
Party	Candidate	Votes	%	±%
Independent	Gordon McKellar^{†}	8,250	59.62	+16.96
Independent	Bruce Gordon^{†}	7,562	54.65	+11.71
Independent	Nigel Barker	4,505	32.56	(new)
Independent	Carl C Netzler	2,158	15.60	(new)
Informal votes		19	0.14	−0.63
Blank votes		1,025	7.41	−0.23
Turnout		13,837	45.70	−1.63
Registered electors		30,275		
Independent hold				
Independent hold				
^{†} incumbent

=== Palmerston North general constituency ===
2025 Palmerston North general constituency election
Party	Candidate	Votes	%	±%
Independent	Jono Naylor^{†}	11,318	48.87	−13.69
Independent	Peter Wells	10,263	44.32	(new)
Independent	Wiremu Te Awe Awe^{†}	9,140	39.47	−5.56
Independent	Fiona Gordon^{†}	8,626	37.25	−13.58
Independent Green	Emma Gregg	6,470	27.94	(new)
Independent	Jackie Lindsay	6,342	27.39	(new)
Independent	Daniel Fordyce	5,082	21.94	(new)
Independent	Charle George	4,796	20.71	(new)
Independent	Shareel Nand-Mishra	4,189	18.09	(new)
Independent	Munu Karki	2,367	10.22	(new)
Informal votes		429	1.85	+0.61
Blank votes		1,415	6.11	+0.44
Turnout		23,158	42.70	+4.14
Registered electors		54,228		
Independent hold				
Independent gain from Independent				
Independent hold				
Independent hold				
^{†} incumbent

=== Horowhenua general constituency ===
2025 Horowhenua general constituency election
Party	Candidate	Votes	%	±%
Independent	Hamish Easton	5,594	51.34	(new)
Independent	Luka Jansen	4,028	36.97	(new)
Independent	Donald Hayes	3,049	27.98	−9.12
Independent	Josephine Gutry	2,125	19.50	(new)
Independent	John Girling	2,083	19.12	(new)
Independent	Pou Sefesi	1,651	15.15	(new)
Informal votes		12	0.11	+0.09
Blank votes		756	6.94	+0.07
Turnout		10,896	48.07	+0.10
Registered electors		22,666		
Independent gain from Independent				
Independent gain from Independent Green				

=== Tararua general constituency ===
2025 Tararua general constituency election
Party	Candidate	Votes	%	±%
Independent	Sally Dryland	3,176	49.01	(new)
Independent	Grace Pettit	2,251	34.74	(new)
Informal votes		2	0.03	n/a
Blank votes		1,048	16.17	n/a
Turnout		6,480	56.70	n/a
Registered electors		11,428		
Independent gain from Independent				

=== Raki Māori constituency ===
2025 Raki Māori constituency election
Party	Candidate	Votes	%	±%
Te Pāti Māori	Elijah Pue	2,181	49.34	(new)
Independent	Soraya Peke-Mason	1,021	23.10	(new)
Independent	Tāwhiao Te Rangi McMaster	627	14.19	(new)
Independent	Jim Turuhia Edmonds^{†}	315	7.13	n/a
Informal votes		124	2.81	n/a
Blank votes		149	3.37	n/a
Turnout		4,420	43.47	n/a
Registered electors		10,169		
Te Pāti Māori gain from Independent				
^{†} incumbent

=== Tonga Māori constituency ===
2025 Tonga Māori constituency election
Party	Candidate	Votes	%	±%
Independent	Te Kenehi Teira^{†}	elected unopposed		
Registered electors		9,696		
Independent hold				
^{†} incumbent

=== Referendum on Māori constituencies ===
Referendum on Māori constituencies
Choice	Votes	%
I vote to KEEP Māori constituencies	36,864	50.53
I vote to REMOVE Māori constituencies	36,088	49.47
Informal	19	0.02
Blank	7,996	9.88
Turnout	80,967	
Registered		
Result:	Māori constituencies to be retained at next election.	

=== Chair election ===
Nikki Riley (Independent) was elected, defeating Bruce Gordon (Independent) 8-to-6.

== Greater Wellington Regional Council ==
2025 Greater Wellington Regional Council election
- 11 October 2025
- Turnout: 161,396 (47.58% ▲4.17 pp)
- 14 seats on the governing body of Greater Wellington Regional Council; 8 seats needed for a majority
Party	Seats	+/–
Independent	9	0
Green	2	−1
Labour	2	+1
ACT Local	1	+1
This lists parties that won seats. See the complete results below.
Control before	Control after
No majority	No majority

Chair election
- 30 October 2025

8 of 14 votes needed for majority
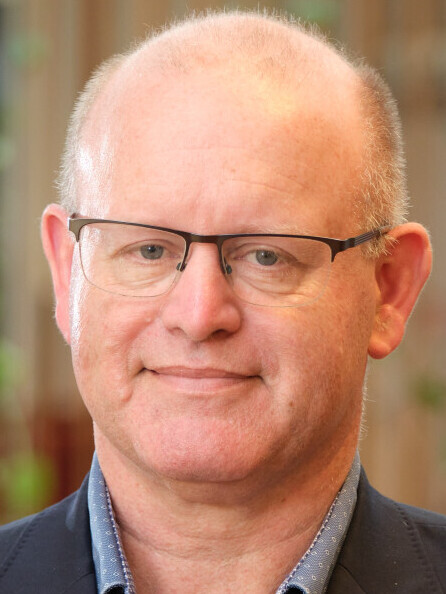
Candidate	Daran Ponter
Party	Labour
Electoral vote	Unopposed
Chair before election
Daran Ponter
Labour
Elected Chair
Daran Ponter
Labour

=== Kāpiti Coast general constituency ===
2025 Kāpiti Coast general constituency election
Party	Candidate	Primary votes	%	±%	Iteration	
Party	Candidate	Primary votes	%	±%	#	Votes
Independent	Penny Gaylor^{†}	9,306	48.71	−3.75	1st	9,306
Independent	Sam Ferguson	8,096	42.38	(new)	1st	8,096
Quota		8,701	45.55	−0.77		
Informal votes		22	0.12	+0.06		
Blank votes		1,680	8.79	+1.78		
Turnout		19,104	46.99	+1.41		
Registered electors		40,658				
Independent hold on 1st iteration						
^{†} incumbent

=== Porirua-Tawa general constituency ===
2025 Porirua-Tawa general constituency election
Party	Candidate	Primary votes	%	±%	Iteration	
Party	Candidate	Primary votes	%	±%	#	Votes
Independent	Phil Rhodes	5,437	26.56	(new)	3rd	7,075
Independent	Claire Johnstone	4,184	20.44	(new)	4th	6,193
Independent	Hikitia Ropata^{†}	4,290	20.95	+1.42	4th	5,115
Independent	Grenville Gaskell	3,145	15.36	(new)	2nd	3,430
Independent	Daniel Hicks	1,470	7.18	(new)	1st	1,470
Quota		6,175	30.16	−0.84		
Informal votes		100	0.49	+0.03		
Blank votes		1,839	8.98	+2.64		
Turnout		20,474	42.40	+4.51		
Registered electors		48,286				
Independent gain from Independent on 3rd iteration						
Independent gain from Independent on 4th iteration						
^{†} incumbent

=== Te Awa Kairangi ki Uta/Upper Hutt general constituency ===
2025 Te Awa Kairangi ki Uta/Upper Hutt general constituency election
Party	Candidate	Primary votes	%	±%	Iteration	
Party	Candidate	Primary votes	%	±%	#	Votes
Independent	Ros Connelly^{†}	elected unopposed				
Registered electors		31,023				
Independent hold on 1st iteration						
^{†} incumbent

=== Te Awa Kairangi ki Tai/Lower Hutt general constituency ===
2025 Te Awa Kairangi ki Tai/Lower Hutt general constituency election
Party	Candidate	Primary votes	%	±%	Iteration	
Party	Candidate	Primary votes	%	±%	#	Votes
Green	Quentin Duthie^{†}	7,676	25.39	+5.13	1st	7,676
Independent	Gabriel Tupou	5,906	19.54	(new)	5th	6,956
ACT Local	Nigel Elder	5,378	17.79	(new)	9th	6,951
Independent	Mike Fisher	2,168	7.17	(new)	9th	4,537
Independent	Mike Stevenson	2,290	7.58	−0.98	8th	3,261
Independent	Matt Shand	1,258	4.16	(new)	5th	1,620
Independent	Omar Faruque	1,217	4.03	(new)	4th	1,429
Independent	Tom Murphy	1,066	3.53	(new)	2nd	1,115
Quota		6,740	22.30	−0.71		
Informal votes		880	2.91	+0.11		
Blank votes		2,377	7.86	+2.74		
Turnout		30,230	42.14	+1.16		
Registered electors		71,736				
Green hold on 1st iteration						
Independent gain from Independent on 5th iteration						
ACT Local gain from Independent on 9th iteration						
^{†} incumbent

=== Pōneke/Wellington general constituency ===
2025 Pōneke/Wellington general constituency election
Party	Candidate	Primary votes	%	±%	Iteration	
Party	Candidate	Primary votes	%	±%	#	Votes
Independent	Simon Woolf^{†}	11,552	15.70	+1.03	2nd	11,772
Labour	Daran Ponter^{†}	11,125	15.12	+4.37	3rd	11,549
Green	Yadana Saw^{†}	10,401	14.13	−0.06	5th	13,327
Labour	Tom James	6,421	8.72	(new)	11th	11,829
Independent	Sarah Free	6,846	9.30	(new)	11th	11,160
ACT Local	Alice Claire Hurdle	6,264	8.51	(new)	11th	8,206
Independent	Tom Kay	3,941	5.35	(new)	9th	6,381
Independent	Glenda Hughes	4,512	6.13	+0.00	7th	5,063
Green	Henry Peach	4,254	5.78	(new)	4th	4,601
Independent	Belinda McFadgen	3,192	4.34	(new)	2nd	3,303
Independent	Mark Kelynack	1,297	1.76	(new)	1st	1,297
Quota		11,634	15.81	+0.29		
Informal votes		387	0.53	+0.01		
Blank votes		3,368	4.58	−1.09		
Turnout		73,596	51.04	+5.15		
Registered electors		144,191				
Independent hold on 2nd iteration						
Labour hold on 3rd iteration						
Green hold on 5th iteration						
Labour gain from Green on 11th iteration						
Independent gain from Independent on 11th iteration						
^{†} incumbent

=== Wairarapa general constituency ===
2025 Wairarapa general constituency election
Party	Candidate	Primary votes	%	±%	Iteration	
Party	Candidate	Primary votes	%	±%	#	Votes
Independent	Adrienne Staples^{†}	8,875	48.98	n/a	1st	8,875
Independent	Alistair Plimmer	7,461	41.18	n/a	1st	7,461
Quota		8,168	45.08	n/a		
Informal votes		18	0.10	n/a		
Blank votes		1,697	9.37	n/a		
Turnout		18,118	52.75	n/a		
Registered electors		34,349				
Independent hold on 1st iteration						
^{†} incumbent

=== Te Upoko o te ika a Māui Māori constituency ===
2025 Te Upoko o te ika a Māui Māori constituency election
Party	Candidate	Primary votes	%	±%	Iteration	
Party	Candidate	Primary votes	%	±%	#	Votes
Independent	Shamia Makarini	elected unopposed				
Registered electors		26,194				
Independent win (new seat) on 1st iteration						

=== Referendum on Māori constituencies ===
Referendum on Māori constituencies
Choice	Votes	%
I vote to KEEP Māori constituencies	109,644	58.36
I vote to REMOVE Māori constituencies	63,029	33.55
Informal	44	0.02
Blank	15,155	8.17
Turnout	187,872	(47.39)
Registered	396,437	
Result:	Māori constituencies to be retained at next election.	

=== Chair election ===
Incumbent chair Daran Ponter (Labour) was re-elected unopposed.

== West Coast Regional Council ==
2025 West Coast Regional Council election
- 11 October 2025
- Turnout: 12,546 (52.37% ▲0.19 pp)
- 7 seats on the governing body of West Coast Regional Council; 4 seats needed for a majority
Party	Seats	+/–
Independent	6	−1
Reform	1	+1
This lists parties that won seats. See the complete results below.
Control before	Control after
No majority	No majority

Chair election
- 29 October 2025

4 of 7 votes needed for majority
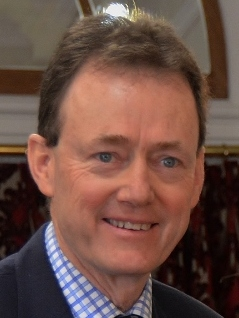
Candidate	Colin Smith
Party	Independent
Electoral vote	Unopposed
Chair before election
Peter Haddock
Independent
Elected Chair
Colin Smith
Independent

=== Buller constituency ===
2025 Buller constituency election
Party	Candidate	Votes	%	±%
Independent	Chris Coll	3,050	72.67	(new)
Independent	Mark McIntyre^{†}	2,357	56.16	+33.94
Reform	Kevin Smith	1,101	26.23	(new)
Informal votes		1	0.02	−0.92
Blank votes		136	3.24	+0.47
Turnout		4,197	55.04	+5.84
Registered electors		7,625		
Independent gain from Independent				
Independent hold				
^{†} incumbent

=== Grey constituency ===
2025 Grey constituency election
Party	Candidate	Votes	%	±%
Independent	Colin Smith	2,242	47.91	(new)
Reform	Allan Birchfield^{†}	2,039	43.57	−20.42
Independent	Peter Ewen^{†}	1,874	40.04	−25.10
Reform	Allan John Rooney	1,567	33.48	(new)
Independent	Brett Cummings^{†}	1,542	32.95	−28.59
Reform	Glenys Perkins	1,488	31.79	(new)
Independent	Brendon Russ	1,418	30.30	(new)
Informal votes		6	0.13	+0.11
Blank votes		80	1.71	−3.48
Turnout		4,680	47.35	−1.97
Registered electors		9,883		
Independent gain from Independent				
Reform gain from Independent				
Independent hold				
^{†} incumbent

=== Westland constituency ===
2025 Westland constituency election
Party	Candidate	Votes	%	±%
Independent	Andy Campbell^{†}	1,487	40.51	−1.35
Independent	Ashley Cassin	1,443	39.31	(new)
Independent	Jen Williams	957	26.07	(new)
Independent	Jan Derks	823	22.42	(new)
Reform	Sheila Julian	742	20.21	(new)
Independent	Andrew Wiffen	740	20.16	(new)
Informal votes		16	0.44	+0.15
Blank votes		170	4.63	+0.27
Turnout		3,671	56.84	−3.54
Registered electors		6,459		
Independent hold				
Independent gain from Independent				
^{†} incumbent

=== Chair election ===
Colin Smith (Independent) was elected unopposed.

== Environment Canterbury ==
2025 Environment Canterbury election
- 11 October 2025
- Turnout: 192,854 (41.61% ▼3.76 pp)
- 14 of 16 seats on the governing body of Environment Canterbury; 9 seats needed for a majority
Party	Seats	+/–
Independent	11	−1
People's Choice	3	+1
This lists parties that won seats. See the complete results below.
Control before	Control after
No majority	No majority

Chair election
- 29 October 2025

9 of 16 votes needed for majority
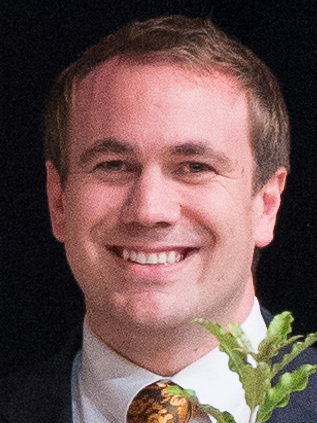
Candidate	Deon Swiggs
Party	Independent
Electoral vote	Unopposed
Chair before election
Craig Pauling
People's Choice
Elected Chair
Deon Swiggs
Independent

=== North Canterbury/Ōpukepuke constituency ===
2025 North Canterbury/Ōpukepuke constituency election
Party	Candidate	Votes	%	±%
Independent	Claire McKay^{†}	11,990	44.74	−4.54
Independent	John Faulkner	9,901	36.94	(new)
Independent	Grant Edge^{†}	9,624	35.91	−6.50
Independent	Tane Apanui	6,151	22.95	(new)
Independent	Frankie Karetai Wood-Bodley	4,357	16.26	(new)
Informal votes		74	0.28	+0.20
Blank votes		3,314	12.37	+0.80
Turnout		26,800	43.38	−2.68
Registered electors		61,786		
Independent hold				
Independent gain from Independent				
^{†} incumbent

=== Christchurch West/Ōpuna constituency ===
2025 Christchurch West/Ōpuna constituency election
Party	Candidate	Votes	%	±%
Independent	Deon Swiggs^{†}	14,806	51.01	+17.65
People's Choice	Sara Gerard	14,453	49.79	(new)
Independent	Michael Bennett	8,629	29.73	(new)
People's Choice	Colin Meurk	8,115	27.96	(new)
Informal votes		5	0.02	+0.00
Blank votes		2,148	7.40	−2.25
Turnout		29,028	38.27	−7.47
Registered electors		75,844		
Independent hold				
People's Choice gain from Independent				
^{†} incumbent

=== Mid-Canterbury/Ōpākihi constituency ===
2025 Mid-Canterbury/Ōpākihi constituency election
Party	Candidate	Votes	%	±%
Independent	Ian Mackenzie^{†}	18,725	50.56	−6.99
Independent	John Sunckell^{†}	16,001	43.20	−7.59
Independent	Helen Troy	14,391	38.86	(new)
Independent	Peter Trolove	12,287	33.17	−2.49
Informal votes		54	0.15	−0.21
Blank votes		2,549	6.88	+0.22
Turnout		37,037	47.71	+2.03
Registered electors		77,633		
Independent hold				
Independent hold				
^{†} incumbent

=== South Canterbury/Ōtuhituhi constituency ===
2025 South Canterbury/Ōtuhituhi constituency election
Party	Candidate	Votes	%	±%
Independent	Nick Ward^{†}	13,854	63.60	+14.40
Independent	Peter Scott^{†}	9,502	43.62	−3.74
ACT Local	Toni Severin	7,755	35.60	(new)
Informal votes		3	0.01	−0.10
Blank votes		1,958	8.99	−1.60
Turnout		21,783	49.84	−0.48
Registered electors		43,707		
Independent hold				
Independent hold				
^{†} incumbent

=== Christchurch North East/Ōrei constituency ===
2025 Christchurch North East/Ōrei constituency election
Party	Candidate	Votes	%	±%
Independent	Ashley Campbell	11,351	42.93	+12.63
People's Choice/Labour	Joe Davies^{†}	10,991	41.57	+3.89
Independent	David East^{†}	10,569	39.97	−18.69
People's Choice/Labour	Peter Langlands	8,907	33.69	(new)
Informal votes		6	0.02	+0.00
Blank votes		1,202	4.55	−5.46
Turnout		26,442	37.04	+0.00
Registered electors		71,384		
Independent gain from Independent				
People's Choice/Labour hold				
^{†} incumbent

=== Christchurch Central/Ōhoko constituency ===
2025 Christchurch Central/Ōhoko constituency election
Party	Candidate	Votes	%	±%
Independent	Genevieve Robinson^{†}	8,617	36.87	−5.66
Independent	Nettles Lamont	8,263	35.36	(new)
Independent	Alexandra Davids	6,623	28.34	(new)
Independent	Lindon Boyce	4,331	18.53	+11.49
Independent	Ross Boswell	41,448	177.36	(new)
Independent	Benjamin Alexander	3,567	15.26	(new)
Independent	Alan (Huijian) Wang	3,255	13.93	(new)
Informal votes		16	0.07	+0.04
Blank votes		1,602	6.85	−3.24
Turnout		23,370	34.45	−3.54
Registered electors		67,829		
Independent hold				
Independent gain from Independent				
^{†} incumbent

=== Christchurch South/Ōwhanga constituency ===
2025 Christchurch South/Ōwhanga constituency election
Party	Candidate	Votes	%	±%
People's Choice	Andrea Davis	14,960	52.57	(new)
Independent	Nick Moody	11,288	39.66	(new)
Independent	Mananui Ramsden	8,649	30.39	(new)
Independent	Bill Kingston	4,527	15.91	(new)
Independent	Mike Okey	3,587	12.60	(new)
Independent	Philip Robinson	2,752	9.67	(new)
Independent	John McLister	2,310	8.12	(new)
Informal votes		17	0.06	+0.03
Blank votes		1,465	5.15	−4.60
Turnout		28,460	43.56	−5.94
Registered electors		65,342		
People's Choice gain from Independent				
Independent gain from Independent				

=== Chair election ===
Deon Swiggs (Independent) was elected unopposed.

== Otago Regional Council ==
2025 Otago Regional Council election
- 11 October 2025
- Turnout: 80,530 (47.10% ▼1.72 pp)
- 12 seats on the governing body of Otago Regional Council; 7 seats needed for a majority
Party	Seats	+/–
Independent	7	−4
Vision Otago	3	+3
Green	1	0
ACT Local	1	+1
This lists parties that won seats. See the complete results below.
Control before	Control after
No majority	No majority

Chair election
- 29 October 2025

7 of 12 votes needed for majority
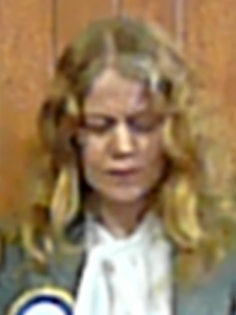
Candidate	Hilary Calvert
Party	Vision Otago
Electoral vote	Unopposed
Chair before election
Gretchen Robertson
Independent
Elected Chair
Hilary Calvert
Vision Otago

=== Dunstan constituency ===
2025 Dunstan constituency election
Party	Candidate	Primary votes	%	±%	Iteration	
Party	Candidate	Primary votes	%	±%	#	Votes
Vision Otago	Michael Laws^{†}	5,930	26.12	−20.31	1st	5,930
Vision Otago	Gary Kelliher^{†}	3,616	15.93	−32.29	2nd	4,451
Independent	Matt Hollyer	3,516	15.49	(new)	4th	4,269
Independent	Neil Gillespie	2,733	12.04	(new)	6th	3,899
Independent	Ben Farrell	2,472	10.89	(new)	6th	3,503
Independent	Amie Pont	1,571	6.92	(new)	3rd	1,888
Vision Otago	Nicky Rhodes	731	3.22	(new)	2nd	986
Quota		4,114	18.12	n/a		
Informal votes		741	3.26	+2.76		
Blank votes		1,368	6.03	−0.99		
Turnout		22,700	46.48	+1.05		
Registered electors		48,840				
Vision Otago gain from Independent on 1st iteration						
Vision Otago gain from Independent on 2nd iteration						
Independent gain from Independent on 4th iteration						
Independent win (new seat) on 6th iteration						
^{†} incumbent

=== Moeraki constituency ===
2025 Moeraki constituency election
Party	Candidate	Primary votes	%	±%	Iteration	
Party	Candidate	Primary votes	%	±%	#	Votes
Independent	Kevin Malcolm^{†}	4,742	58.60	n/a	1st	4,742
Independent	Sophia Leone De La Barra	2,567	31.72	(new)	1st	2,567
Quota		3,655	45.17	n/a		
Informal votes		9	0.11	n/a		
Blank votes		719	8.89	n/a		
Turnout		8,092	53.51	n/a		
Registered electors		15,121				
Independent hold on 1st iteration						
^{†} incumbent

=== Molyneux constituency ===
2025 Molyneux constituency election
Party	Candidate	Primary votes	%	±%	Iteration	
Party	Candidate	Primary votes	%	±%	#	Votes
ACT Local	Robbie Byars	3,845	26.56	(new)	2nd	4,503
Independent	Kate Wilson^{†}	3,579	24.72	−19.83	2nd	4,258
Independent	Lloyd McCall^{†}	2,672	18.46	−37.45	2nd	3,112
Vision Otago	Carmen Felicity Hope (née Knowler)	2,187	15.11	−27.44	1st	2,187
Quota		4,094	28.28	n/a		
Informal votes		220	1.52	+0.71		
Blank votes		1,972	13.62	+0.28		
Turnout		14,477	53.12	−2.41		
Registered electors		27,252				
ACT Local gain from Independent on 2nd iteration						
Independent hold on 2nd iteration						
^{†} incumbent

=== Dunedin constituency ===
2025 Dunedin constituency election
Party	Candidate	Primary votes	%	±%	Iteration	
Party	Candidate	Primary votes	%	±%	#	Votes
Vision Otago	Hilary Calvert	6,646	18.80	(new)	1st	6,646
Independent	Andrew Noone^{†}	4,866	13.76	−24.41	2nd	5,280
Independent	Gretchen Robertson^{†}	4,030	11.40	(new)	7th	4,884
Independent	Chanel Gardner	3,244	9.17	n/a	9th	4,716
Green	Alan Somerville^{†}	3,107	8.79	−19.60	14th	4,636
Independent Green	Elliot Weir^{†}	3,238	9.16	−22.47	14th	4,469
Independent	Tim Mepham^{†}	1,739	4.92	−23.17	7th	2,299
Independent	Phil Glassey	1,307	3.70	(new)	6th	1,833
Radical Action	James Cockle^{†}	1,108	3.13	−13.05	4th	1,248
Independent	Alex King	977	2.76	(new)	3rd	1,019
Quota		5,044	14.27	n/a		
Informal votes		353	1.00	−1.33		
Blank votes		4,725	13.36	−13.55		
Turnout		35,359	44.34	−4.14		
Registered electors		79,753				
Vision Otago gain from Independent on 1st iteration						
Independent hold on 2nd iteration						
Independent hold on 7th iteration						
Independent gain from Independent on 9th iteration						
Green hold on 14th iteration						
^{†} incumbent

=== Chair election ===
Hilary Calvert (Vision Otago) was elected unopposed.

== Environment Southland ==
2025 Environment Southland election
- 11 October 2025
- Turnout: 20,794 (46.11% ▼5.82 pp)
- 12 seats on the governing body of Environment Southland; 7 seats needed for a majority
Party	Seats	+/–
Independent	12	0
This lists parties that won seats. See the complete results below.
Control before	Control after
No majority	No majority

Chair election
- 28 October 2025

7 of 12 votes needed for majority
Candidate	Jeremy McPhail
Party	Independent
Electoral vote	Unopposed
Chair before election
Nicol Horrell
Independent
Elected Chair
Jeremy McPhail
Independent

=== Fiordland constituency ===
2025 Fiordland constituency election
Party	Candidate	Votes	%	±%
Independent	Paul Evans^{†}	elected unopposed		
Registered electors		2,900		
Independent hold				
^{†} incumbent

=== Eastern-Dome constituency ===
2025 Eastern-Dome constitueny election
Party	Candidate	Votes	%	±%
Independent	Alastair Gibson^{†}	elected unopposed		
Independent	Jeremy McPhail^{†}	elected unopposed		
Registered electors		11,467		
Independent hold				
Independent hold				
^{†} incumbent

=== Western constituency ===
2025 Western constituency election
Party	Candidate	Votes	%	±%
Independent	Ewen Mathieson	elected unopposed		
Registered electors		4,921		
Independent gain from Independent				

=== Hokonui constituency ===
2025 Hokonui constituency election
Party	Candidate	Votes	%	±%
Independent	David Rose	1,378	52.32	(new)
Independent	Peter McDonald^{†}	1,142	43.36	−8.01
Informal votes		2	0.08	+0.04
Blank votes		109	4.14	−4.29
Turnout		2,634	44.11	+0.00
Registered electors		5,972		
Independent gain from Independent				
^{†} incumbent

=== Southern constituency ===
2025 Southern constituency election
Party	Candidate	Votes	%	±%
Independent	Jon Pemberton^{†}	elected unopposed		
Registered electors		4,016		
Independent hold				
^{†} incumbent

=== Invercargill-Rakiura constituency ===
2025 Invercargill-Rakiura constituency election
Party	Candidate	Votes	%	±%
Independent	Eric Roy^{†}	8,568	47.14	−7.32
Independent	Lyndal Ludlow^{†}	7,883	43.38	−3.02
Independent	Maurice Rodway^{†}	7,096	39.04	−7.15
Independent	Roger Hodson	5,921	32.58	(new)
Independent	Geoffrey Young	5,469	30.09	(new)
Independent	Phil Morrison^{†}	5,354	29.46	−9.53
Independent	Joshua Cumberland	5,316	29.25	(new)
Independent	Nathan Surendran	5,295	29.14	(new)
Independent	Annette Trent	4,923	27.09	(new)
Independent	Rob Te Maiharoa	4,686	25.78	(new)
Independent	Nick Perham	3,782	20.81	(new)
Informal votes		9	0.05	−0.01
Blank votes		1,953	10.75	+1.54
Turnout		18,174	46.45	−6.81
Registered electors		39,124		
Independent hold				
Independent hold				
Independent hold				
Independent gain from Independent				
Independent gain from Independent				
Independent hold				
^{†} incumbent

=== Chair election ===
Jeremy McPhail (Independent) was elected unopposed.

== See also ==
- Results of the 2025 New Zealand territorial authority elections
- 2025 New Zealand local referendums on Māori wards and constituencies
