= Marian Hobbs =

New Zealand politician (born 1947)

The Honourable Marian Hobbs
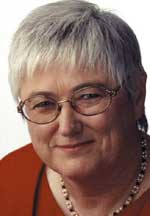

11th Minister for the Environment
- In office 10 December 1999 – 19 October 2005
- Prime Minister: Helen Clark
- Preceded by: Simon Upton
- Succeeded by: David Benson-Pope

20th Minister of Broadcasting
- In office 27 March 2001 – 15 August 2002
- Prime Minister: Helen Clark
- Preceded by: Steve Maharey
- Succeeded by: David Cunliffe
- In office 10 December 1999 – 23 February 2001
- Prime Minister: Helen Clark
- Preceded by: Maurice Williamson
- Succeeded by: Steve Maharey

Member of the New Zealand Parliament for Wellington Central
- In office 27 November 1999 – 8 November 2008
- Preceded by: Richard Prebble
- Succeeded by: Grant Robertson

Member of the New Zealand Parliament for Labour list
- In office 12 October 1996 – 27 November 1999

Personal details
- Born: 18 December 1947 (age 78)
- Party: Labour
- Children: 2
- Profession: Teacher

Marian Leslie Hobbs (born 18 December 1947) is a New Zealand politician who was a Labour Member of Parliament from 1996 to 2008. She was initially a list MP and then (from 1999) represented the Wellington Central electorate. She served as Minister for the Environment and, later, as one of two Assistant Speakers of the House of Representatives. She represented the Dunedin constituency of the Otago Regional Council from 2019 to 2021.

== Early life ==
Hobbs was raised in Christchurch and was educated at St Dominic's College, Dunedin. Before entering politics, Hobbs worked as a teacher at Aranui High School and was the principal of Avonside Girls' High School in Christchurch. She helped to establish the Chippenham commune in Christchurch and is by religious affiliation a Friend (Quaker). In 1993, Hobbs was awarded the New Zealand Suffrage Centennial Medal.

After leaving school, Hobbs renounced her Catholic beliefs, later becoming a Quaker. At university she was a student radical and joined the Communist Party. Hobbs marched with HART in the 1981 Springbok tour to oppose Apartheid. After the tour she developed a strong interest in Māori issues and became fluent in the language. In May 1996, she was offered the position of principal of Wellington Girls' College, but never ended up taking the job, instead moving into Parliament on the Labour list.

== Member of Parliament ==
New Zealand Parliament
Years	Term	Electorate	List	Party
1996–1999	45th	List	12	Labour
1999–2002	46th	Wellington Central	23	Labour
2002–2005	47th	Wellington Central	17	Labour
2005–2008	48th	Wellington Central	9	Labour

Hobbs stood unsuccessfully in the 1994 Selwyn by-election where she came a distant third. She contested the Kaikoura electorate in the 1996 election and came second to National Party's Doug Kidd, but entered Parliament via the Labour list, where she was ranked 12th. Upon entering parliament Hobbs was designated opposition spokesperson for broadcasting, communications and information technology by leader Helen Clark.

In the lead up to the following election Hobbs wavered between again contesting Kaikoura or Wellington Central, having moved to Wellington permanently after becoming a list MP. She chose to stand in Wellington Central because she lived there and stated she hated travelling. Hobbs was selected as Labour candidate for the seat over Victoria University dean of law Professor Brian Brooks, teacher Elaine Whelan and former Wellington City Councillor Hazel Armstrong. In the 1999 election, Hobbs won the Wellington Central electorate, defeating the incumbent member, ACT Party leader Richard Prebble.

=== Cabinet minister ===
After Labour's electoral victory in 1999, Hobbs joined the Cabinet, becoming Minister for the Environment, Minister of Biosecurity, Minister of Broadcasting, and Minister Responsible for the National Library of New Zealand and Archives New Zealand. In February 2001, she briefly resigned from Cabinet while an enquiry investigated her allowance-claims; she returned in late March after receiving official clearance.

As Minister of Broadcasting, Hobbs set a code of practice for New Zealand commercial radio, specifying that 20 percent of music played should have New Zealand origins.

Following the 2002 general election, Hobbs continued as the Minister for the Environment and Minister Responsible for the National Library and Archives New Zealand, and picked up new roles as Minister of Disarmament and Arms Control, Associate Minister of Foreign Affairs and Trade with responsibility for Official Development Assistance, Associate Minister for Biosecurity, Associate Minister of Education, and Minister Responsible for Urban Affairs.

=== Resignation from Cabinet ===
In 2004, Hobbs told Prime Minister Helen Clark that she did not expect to seek a post in Cabinet again after the 2005 general election. Hobbs contested the election and was returned to the Wellington Central electorate with a 6,180 majority over the National Party candidate, Mark Blumsky. She made her decision about not seeking a Cabinet role public during the negotiations to form a government in October 2005.

After resigning from Cabinet, Hobbs served briefly as Labour's party Vice-President and became the Assistant Speaker of the House in March 2008, after Ann Hartley resigned.

In December 2006 Hobbs announced (during a radio interview) that she would not seek re-election at the 2008 general election, confirming much speculation to that effect. She was succeeded in Wellington Central by Grant Robertson, who had worked for her while she was a minister.

== Post-Parliamentary career ==
Before leaving Parliament, Hobbs signalled her intention to work as a teacher in the United Kingdom, in compensation for never having made a traditional working-holiday as a young woman. She spent two years as the Headteacher at Prince William School in Oundle, Northamptonshire, United Kingdom.

Hobbs stood as a Labour candidate for the Otago Regional Council at the 2019 local elections and was successful. On 23 October, she was elected as chair, with Michael Laws as her deputy. In a vote on 8 July 2020, she lost the role and was replaced by councillor Andrew Noone. She resigned from the council on 1 November 2021.

== Personal life ==
Hobbs had one son, Daniel, with her first husband Walter Logeman. Her second marriage was to maths teacher Geoff Norris with whom she unexpectedly had a daughter, Claire.

Her father was Leslie Hobbs, a political journalist, who wrote The Thirty-Year Wonders, a history of the First and Second Labour Governments and their members.

== See also ==
- Contents of the United States diplomatic cables leak (New Zealand)

Political offices
Preceded by Simon Upton	Minister for the Environment; 1999–2005	Succeeded by David Benson-Pope
Preceded by Maurice Williamson	Minister of Broadcasting; 1999–2001 2001–2002	Succeeded by Steve Maharey
Preceded by Steve Maharey	Minister of Broadcasting; 1999–2001 2001–2002	Succeeded by David Cunliffe
New Zealand Parliament
Preceded by Richard Prebble	Member of Parliament for Wellington Central; 1999–2008	Succeeded by Grant Robertson
