= Michael Laws =

New Zealand politician (born 1957)

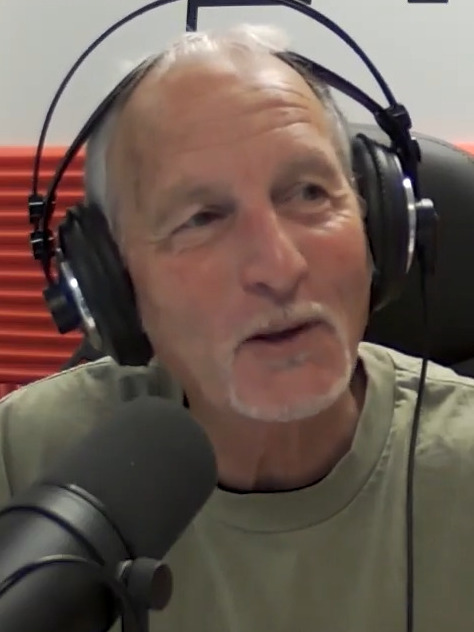
- Laws in 2022

Deputy Chair of Otago Regional Council
- In office 2019–2022
- Preceded by: Gretchen Robertson
- Succeeded by: Lloyd McCall

26th Mayor of Whanganui
- In office 2004–2010
- Preceded by: Chas Poynter
- Succeeded by: Annette Main

Member of the New Zealand Parliament for Hawkes Bay
- In office 1990–1996
- Succeeded by: Electorate abolished

Personal details
- Born: Michael Brian Laws; 1957 (age 68–69) Wairoa, New Zealand
- Party: Local: Vision Otago (2025–present) National: NZ First (1996–present)
- Children: 5
- Profession: Broadcaster and writer

Michael Brian Laws (born 1957) is a New Zealand politician, broadcaster and writer. Laws was a Member of Parliament for six years, starting in 1990, initially for the National Party. In Parliament he voted against his party on multiple occasions and in 1996 defected to the newly founded New Zealand First party, but resigned from Parliament the same year following a scandal in which he selected a company part-owned by his wife for a government contract.

Laws has also been a media personality, working as a Radio Live morning talkback host and a longstanding The Sunday Star-Times columnist.

Laws has held several roles in local government since 1995. He has been elected as a councillor to Napier City Council (1995–1996), Whanganui District Council (2013–2014) and Otago Regional Council (2016 – present), as a member of Whanganui District Health Board, and as Mayor of Whanganui (2004–2010).

== Early life ==
Laws was born in Wairoa on 26 June 1957. He moved with his parents to Whanganui where he received his pre-tertiary education at Tawhero Primary School, Whanganui Intermediate School, and Whanganui Boys' College. His father, Keith Laws, a schoolteacher, became rector (principal) of Waitaki Boys' High School in Oamaru and then of Scots College, Wellington.

On leaving school, Laws worked at the Whakatu freezing works before entering the University of Otago, graduating with first-class honours in history and won an Otago University sporting blue. He later obtained a Master of Arts from Victoria University. During his time at Otago, he attracted controversy as a key member of a student organisation that supported the 1981 Springbok Tour. He also became a public speaker and captained both the New Zealand Universities and New Zealand debating teams in the early-mid-1980s.

== Member of Parliament, 1990–1996 ==
New Zealand Parliament
| Years | Term | Electorate | | Party |
|---|---|---|---|---|
| 1990–1993 | 43rd | Hawkes Bay | | National |
| 1993–1996 | 44th | Hawkes Bay | | National |
| 1996 | Changed allegiance to: | | | NZ First |
| 2026–present | 55th | List | 7 | NZ First |

Having become involved in the New Zealand Young Nationals (the youth wing of the National Party), Laws worked as a parliamentary researcher for National between 1985 and 1989. Most of this time he spent as a senior researcher and press secretary, including assisting the dissident National MP Winston Peters from 1987 to 1989. In the 1987 election, Laws stood as the National candidate for the Hawkes Bay seat, but narrowly lost to the incumbent Bill Sutton of the Labour Party. In the 1990 election, however, Laws wrestled the seat from Sutton to enter Parliament with a majority of 2,895 votes. In the 1993 election he retained his seat with an increased majority, despite the National Party generally losing support.

=== Departure from National Party ===
Laws never had a good relationship with the National Party's senior hierarchy. As a researcher, he had done much of his work for Winston Peters, whom party leader Jim Bolger looked upon with disapproval. Tensions persisted between Laws and Bolger after Laws became an MP, made worse by Laws' declaration that he would attempt to follow popular opinion in Hawke's Bay rather than National Party policy. Laws voted against his party on a number of issues, joining several other dissident MPs to oppose the economic policies of the Minister of Finance Ruth Richardson. In early 1991, he even organised public seminars designed to avoid his government's new superannuation surtax policies. The Bolger administration later abandoned the surtax, but Laws earned the ongoing enmity of his colleagues for his stance. He also championed the unsuccessful Death with Dignity Bill, which aimed to legalise voluntary euthanasia. The terminal illness of Cam Campion, a fellow dissident in Laws' first term in parliament, prompted this advocacy.

"Waka-jumping"—where an MP left a party between elections to join another but retain their seat in Parliament—became common during Laws' parliamentary career and rumours frequently circulated that he planned to join a new party. When Gilbert Myles and Hamish MacIntyre left National to found the new Liberal Party, they invited Laws to join them, but he declined. Later, when Peters was expelled from National and eventually formed New Zealand First, it was reported that Laws had considered changing parties but eventually decided that the new party lacked the organisation and principle for success. Finally, Laws became involved in discussions with Mike Moore, former leader (1990–1993) of the Labour Party, to establish a new centrist party. It did not eventuate, however, with Laws claiming that Moore showed unwillingness to commit to it. In the end, Laws' relationship with the National Party deteriorated to the point where he no longer attended caucus meetings, and he decided to join New Zealand First in April 1996.

=== Resignation from Parliament ===
Laws had also been elected (in October 1995) as a Napier city councillor. In that role, Laws awarded a contract to conduct a Napier City Council communications poll to a company part-owned by his wife. This appeared to contravene the Local Government (Members' Interests) Act 1968. Laws claimed "there had been no profit to either company or individuals," and an official inquiry by the Auditor-General confirmed it found only a minor and unintentional breach of regulations in not declaring his wife's shareholding.

However, Laws' conduct during the matter attracted strong criticism. Laws had claimed the poll had been carried out by a person named Antoinette Beck, who was supposedly based in Australia. It later became known Beck was not a real person, her signature had been applied by Laws' parliamentary secretary, and that the poll contract had been awarded to Laws' wife's company. After these facts emerged, Laws resigned both from Parliament and the council.

Two of Laws' principal antagonists in the Antoinette Beck affair—Napier city councillors John Harrison and Kerry Single—unsuccessfully sued him for defamation. Laws defended himself in the Napier High Court in December 1997 and the Court awarded costs of over NZ$200,000 against the joint plaintiffs.

=== 1996 general election ===
Laws remained involved in politics and managed New Zealand First's campaign for the general election held on 12 October 1996. He would later write in his political autobiography that the experience resembled nursing a stick of unstable dynamite. Later he served as an adviser to New Zealand First MP and Associate Minister of Health Neil Kirton in the National–New Zealand First coalition government until Kirton was removed as a minister in 1997.

== Local government career ==
=== Mayor of Whanganui ===
Laws was a member of the Whanganui District Council from 2004 to 2010 (as mayor) and from 2013 to 2014 (as a councillor).

In the 2004 local elections, Laws formed and led a "Vision Wanganui" team which captured the majority of the Council seats and unseated the incumbent mayor Chas Poynter, who placed third behind Laws and John Martin. Laws' administration was controversial: he dismayed the local arts community by cancelling an extension to the Sarjeant Art Gallery, was the subject of a code of conduct investigation after making derogatory comments about some Whanganui residents, and on a radio show he hosted described the deceased Tongan king Taufa'ahau Tupou IV as "a bloated, brown slug." Despite complaints, the Broadcasting Standards Authority cleared Laws of any breach of broadcasting standards. New Zealand Herald readers judged it the "worst insult of 2006". Later the New Zealand Press Council cleared columns he wrote on peanut-allergy sufferers and on public-school bans.

Despite this controversy, Laws' "Vision Wanganui" grouping subsequently won two council by-elections in February 2006 and Laws acquired the reputation of having rejuvenated the city and raising Whanganui's profile. He also led the campaign for gang patches to be banned in Whanganui. The council held a referendum on that subject in 2007, which was voted in the affirmative, and with local MP Chester Borrows the council sponsored a local bill which eventually became law as the Wanganui District Council (Prohibition of Gang Insignia) Act 2009.

In November 2006, Laws announced he would not contest the mayoralty at the 2007 local elections. He said he wanted to spend more time with his family, especially his young daughters Lucy and Zoe, but did not rule himself out of standing for lesser public offices. However, citing public pressure, Laws changed his mind about retiring from the mayoralty and signed up to contest a second term on the last day for nominations to be submitted. He also stood as part of a "reformist" 'Health First' team for the Whanganui District Health Board. Laws was successful in attaining both positions, although neither "Vision Wanganui" or "Health First" won majorities.

In his second term, Laws campaigned for the spelling of "Wanganui" to remain unchanged after local Māori, Te Runanga o Tupoho, petitioned the New Zealand Geographic Board to correct the spelling to "Whanganui" with an "h". The council held a referendum in 2009 showed 77% support for the retention of the then-popular spelling, which had been used since 1837. However, the authority to rename the district rested with the Crown, not the council, and in December 2009 Minister for Land Information Maurice Williamson announced that both spellings would be acceptable but the Crown would adopt the corrected spelling.

Laws announced in June 2010 his retirement from the mayoralty for family reasons.

In the October 2013 local elections, Laws recontested the mayoralty, a councillor position, and a district health board position. He lost the mayoralty to the incumbent Annette Main but was elected as a councillor and to the health board. He resigned from the council in April 2014 to move to Timaru, after taking a position at Craighead Diocesan School.

=== Otago Regional Council ===
==== First and second terms, 2016–2022 ====
In 2016, Laws moved to Cromwell and contested a position on the Otago Regional Council (ORC) in the 2016 local elections. He won his seat in a recount by 5 votes and was re-elected in the 2019 local elections. Laws was appointed deputy chair to new chairperson Marian Hobbs in October 2019 but led a successful effort to replace Hobbs with Andrew Noone in July 2020.

In mid August 2021, ORC chief executive Sarah Gardner lodged a code of conduct against Laws regarding comments that he had made about Council staff in two articles that were published in the Otago Daily Times. One of these stories concerned the Council giving advice to a company that it had taken enforcement action against for illegally dumping waste in the Clutha River. The Council ordered an independent investigation into Law's comments headed by Wellington lawyer Steph Dyhrberg. According to Laws, the potential consequences of the complaint included losing his deputy chairman role, being excluded from council premises and functions, and being censured by his colleagues; which Laws claimed would adversely affect councillors' freedom of speech and expression.

In response to the complaints process, Free Speech Union Chief Executive Jonathan Ayling petitioned Gardner to withdraw her complaint and amend the council's code of conduct to reflect that councillors represent ratepayers rather than the council executive. They also offered their support to Laws. In November 2021, Laws was cleared of any wrongdoing. According to fellow Councillor Gary Kelliher, the code of conduct investigation against Laws amounted to NZ$20,000 since the Council outsourced it to external lawyer Dyhrberg.

Laws resigned as deputy chair in April 2022 over disagreements with the council's 2022/23 annual plan and was replaced by Kevin Malcolm.

==== Third term, 2022–2025 ====
In mid February 2024, Laws and four other councillors voted against the ORC's decision to continue working on its land and water plan despite the National-led coalition government's new directive for councils to delay their freshwater plans in order to accommodate the government's new freshwater policies. Laws and fellow Cr Gary Kelliher warned that the council's vote could give Simmonds justification to dissolve the council and install government-appointed commissioners. He said the council was playing a "very dangerous game of chicken" with the Government and accused his colleagues of refusing to accept the results of the 2023 New Zealand general election.

In mid March 2024, Laws joined a majority of ORC councillors in voting not to extend half-price bus fares for university students. When University of Otago law student Grace expressed disagreement in her email response, Laws countered that Dunedin ratepayers were already subsidising public buses and accused Grace of hypocrisy and selfishness. Otago University Students' Association Politics representative Liam White disagreed with the tone of Laws' response. When questioned by the university student magazine Critic Te Ārohi, Laws defended the tone if his response and accused Grace of selfishness and said that "he could have been much harsher." Following the ORC's vote, Laws welcomed the decision not to continue half-price bus fares for university students and said that the new bus fares were subsidised by ratepayers.

In late March 2024, Laws objected to the Otago Regional Council's decision to notify its regional policy statement after voting on 32 recommendations from an independent hearings panel during a closed doors meeting. The Council defended its decision to exclude the public from the meeting on the grounds that the hearing panel's report and recommendations were subject to appeals. Laws described the decision as "a rushed process with the council being presented with a fait accompli. It seems that local government and open democracy are two foreign concepts."

In mid-June 2024, the Otago Daily Times reported that Laws had stated that he could not trust advice from former ORC biodiversity partnership lead Alex Foulkes and ORC climate change adviser Francisco Hernandez for allegedly being activists due to their membership of the Green Party of Aotearoa New Zealand. Laws also questioned "whether the Green Party has installed an activist cadre within the ORC staff". In response, Foulkes had referred Laws' remarks to the Council's communications team and accused Laws of acting unprofessionally and exhibiting "McCarthyism." Following Foulkes' departure from the ORC, Laws rejected Foulkes' criticism, welcomed his departure and stated "that as an environmental activist, he should never have been hired in the first place."

On 20 September 2024, Laws voted in support of an unsuccessful motion by fellow Cr Kevin Malcolm to pause the Otago Regional Council's land and water regional plan until the National-led coalition government released its updated national freshwater management policy statement. Malcolm's motion was defeated by a margin of 7 to 5. The Council voted to retain their land wand water regional plan. During the meeting, Laws criticised his fellow councillors for continuing with a plan based on directions by the previous Labour Government. He was heckled by members of the audience in the public gallery.

On 22 October 2024, the National-led government passed an amendment to the Resource Management Act Amendment Bill preventing local councils from notifying freshwater plans before the Government replaces its national policy statement for freshwater management (NPSFM). This forced the ORC to cancel its scheduled vote on 23 October notifying its land and water management plan. In response, Laws welcomed the Government's move, saying that it would "save Otago ratepayers millions of dollars in consulting and legal fees, and bring some much needed political sanity to the regional council table." The following day Laws joined six other councillors in voting down a motion expressing "deep concern" about legislation passed in the New Zealand Parliament on 22 October preventing the notification of the Land and Water Regional Plan. He criticised the Council for "playing chicken" with the Government, which he said had a mandate to pass its own laws.

==== Fourth term, 2025–present ====
Laws ran for re-election to the regional council in the 2025 elections under the Vision Otago electoral ticket. Laws along with fellow Vision Otago candidates Hilary Calvert and Gary Kelliher were elected in mid-October 2025. In early November 2025, Laws assumed the strategy and customer portfolio on the Council. He and Kelliher also unsuccessfully opposed a motion for the Otago Regional Council to engage with local Māori mana whenua.

In early December 2025, the ORC voted by a margin of seven to four to appoint Laws as the leader of a working group to review the Council's strategic direction, which would replace the ORC's Strategic Directions 2024–2034 document. Laws was supported by his fellow Vision Otago Crs Calvert and Kelliher, and ACT Local Cr Robbie Byars. Former ORC chairperson Gretchen Robertson and Cr Neils Gillespie opposed the motion on the grounds of insufficient information about the working group's scope.

Though Laws initially supported the New Zealand government's proposal to abolish the regional councils, he revised his opinion after reading through the government's proposal which suggested replaced the councils with regional boards of local mayors. In mid-February 2026, Laws described the proposal as "poorly written, drafted by bureaucrats who used AI when it was in a hallucination state and drawn up by people who had not passed their NCEA literacy tests." He said that the restructure would create another layer of bureaucracy and criticised the performance of territorial authorities, citing Wellington's sewage problems and the foul smell at the Bromley waste treatment plant. Instead, Laws advocated maintaining a regional government in Otago and a separate unitary authority based on the Auckland Council.

In mid-May 2026, Laws and Calvert expressed disagreement with Dunedin City Councillors Lee Vandervis, Andrew Simms and Russell Lund's Otago Daily Times op-ed column arguing that a Dunedin-Waitaki authority should take over control and management of Port Otago as part of the Sixth National Government's local government reforms. In response, Laws stated "I understand that an historically dysfunctional and cash-strapped council might want the asset for its own, but it's an asset that belongs to regional ratepayers — not councils." The following day, Vandervis told Laws and Calvert to "butt out" and supported the Government's plans to disestablish regional councils. In response, Laws argued that Port Otago's future ownership was relevant to the 80,000 residents of his Dunstan ward.

In mid-November 2026, Otago Regional councillor Kate Wilson filed a notice of motion against Laws for his online radio remarks on 4 November about Opportunity Party candidates Kayla Kingdon-Bebb and Qiulae Wong but ruled out filing a code of conduct complaint to avoid escalating the issue. While Laws insisted that his radio show remarks were unrelated to his work as a regional councillor, several colleagues including Gretchen Robertson, Alan Somerville and chairperson Hilary Calvert expressed disagreement with his remarks. On 19 November, Calvert and Wilson declined to pursue a code of conduct complaint against Laws, with the latter "saying they were ineffectual and cost ratepayers money." Laws described criticism of his remarks as "noise and hysteria," and said he had received an "extraordinary level of support in the past two weeks." During the meeting, Calvert said there would be no discussion about Laws' actions but instead tabled a letter disassociating Laws' behaviour towards the female Opportunity candidates from the Otago Regional Council. According to the Wanaka App website, Wilson was disappointed with her motion not being tabled.

== Media career ==
Since leaving Parliament, Laws has worked as a writer, newspaper columnist and talkback radio host.

He joined Radio Pacific in 2003 and changed to Radio Live in 2005. He stayed as a radio host throughout his Whanganui mayoralty, stepping back from his nationwide talkback programme in early 2013. Laws courted controversy in this role, as described above. Additionally, in 2008 he was charged with contempt of court for breaching a suppression order on his radio programme and in October 2010 he called Governor-General Anand Satyanand a "fat Indian." Breakfast presenter Paul Henry had previously made similarly disparaging comments about Satyanand. Laws originally refused to apologise for his comments and only apologised after Henry lost his job over making racist remarks about Indian politician Sheila Dikshit. In 2011, Laws made comments described as "outrageous" about a young man with Asperger syndrome who was arrested for minor theft in the aftermath of the 2011 Christchurch earthquake and was suspended from his radio programme after criticising journalists' conduct in their coverage of the 2011 general election.

On television, Laws has participated in reality television appearances on the second season of Celebrity Treasure Island (2003) and the third season of Dancing with the Stars (2007). He hosted a weekly rugby television programme on Sky from 2004 to 2009.

Laws had a regular column in the Sunday Star-Times and has authored three books: a political memoir, The Demon Profession (1998); a mystery novel, Dancing With Beelzebub (1999); and sports biography Gladiator: the Norm Hewitt Story (2001).

By 2022, Laws had joined The Platform, an online radio station founded by veteran broadcaster Sean Plunket.

== Return to Parliament, 2026–present ==
On 3 July, Laws confirmed that he would be standing as New Zealand First's candidate in the Waitaki electorate during the 2026 New Zealand general election. He cited the impact of central government on local councils and the "predominance" of "big government" and big business in New Zealand as his motivating factors for running for the New Zealand Parliament. Laws expressed interest in serving as Minister for Media and Communications and said that the public broadcaster Radio New Zealand would be "first on the chopping list." He was ranked sixth place on the NZ First party list.

On 4 November, Laws faced backlash after making sexual and misogynistic comments on the internet radio station The Platform directed towards female candidates from the Opportunity Party, more specifically Kayla Kingdon-Bebb, fourth-ranked on the party list, and party leader Qiulae Wong. Wong called for New Zealand First leader Winston Peters to fire Laws, whilst prime minister and leader of the National Party Christopher Luxon announced that, if elected to Government, Laws would not hold a ministerial position. Following criticism, Laws apologised for his remarks.

On 7 November, Laws came third place in Waitaki, with 3,922 votes based on preliminary results. He was elected to Parliament on the NZ First party list. Despite being elected to Parliament, Laws declined to attend Parliament's induction events in November 2026 including lectures and workshops set up by the Parliamentary Service for new MPs. As a Member of Parliament-elect, Laws is eligible for an MP's salary in addition to his Otago Regional councillor and Platform podcasting salaries. An NZ First spokesperson told Stuff that Laws did not attend in-person events due to a broken elbow he sustained in October 2026 and suggested that he may have attended online parliamentary events. Laws had also told Stuff that he was considering serving as both a councillor and Member of Parliament.

On 20 November, Laws said that he was not going to resign as a Member of Parliament for his earlier sexist remarks attacking Opportunity politicians. During a YouTube broadcast on his Platform radio show, he said that he appreciated the "enormous amount of support" he had received from listeners over the past fortnight. Laws also said:

The liberal lanyard media managerial orthodoxy has become the new tyranny in New Zealand and that tyranny must be treated as such and it must be resisted. You do not resist by walking away, you resist by advocating, fighting and standing in battle.

== Personal life ==
Michael Laws has five children. The eldest two are from relationships prior to his political career; the youngest three, with former partner Leonie Brookhammer, were born during Laws' Whanganui mayoralty. Laws and Brookhammer separated in 2009.

== Published works ==
Laws, Michael (1998). The Demon Profession. Auckland: HarperCollins (New Zealand). ISBN 1-86950-257-4

New Zealand Parliament
| Preceded by Bill Sutton | Member of Parliament for Hawkes Bay; 1990–1996 | Electorate abolished |
