= Hilary Calvert =

List ACT MP

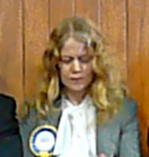
- Hilary Calvert campaigning in 2008

Member of the New Zealand Parliament for ACT party list
- In office 24 September 2010 – 26 November 2011
- Preceded by: David Garrett (Note: Normally, list MPs do not have individual predecessors or successors, but Garrett resigned during a sitting parliament and therefore was succeeded by Calvert.)

Personal details
- Born: 5 October 1954 (age 72)
- Party: Vision Otago (2025–present); ACT (ca. 2010–2011)
- Spouse: Alistair Broad
- Children: 3
- Profession: Lawyer

Hilary Jane Calvert (born 5 October 1954) is a lawyer and a former member of the New Zealand parliament for the ACT Party. Following the resignation of ACT MP David Garrett in September 2010, she assumed a position in the House of Representatives as the next MP on ACT's list. In 2013 she was elected to the Dunedin City Council, after a failed campaign for mayor. Calvert also served on the Otago Regional Council (ORC) between 2019 and 2022. In 2025, Calvert was re-elected to the ORC as part of the Vision Otago ticket. She subsequently became the Council's chairperson.

== Early years ==
Before entering Parliament, Calvert was a Dunedin-based lawyer who specialising in property law. She is a former member of the Otago Central Rail Trail Charitable Trust.

Calvert is married to Alistair Broad and has three adult daughters. Both Calvert and Broad are trained lawyers, but have given up their practising certificates. Calvert now manages her property portfolio.

== Political career ==
New Zealand Parliament
Years	Term	Electorate	List	Party
2010–2011	49th	List	6	ACT

In the 2008 general election, she was placed number six on the ACT party list and stood in the Dunedin North electorate where she got 1.8% of the votes.

=== Parliamentary career, 2010–2011 ===
David Garrett resigned as an ACT list MP over a passport controversy on 17 September 2010. Garrett then resigned from Parliament on 23 September 2010 and Calvert was declared elected to the House of Representatives the next day. While an MP, she served on several committees and was the ACT Party Whip.

Calvert did not appear on the party list released for the 2011 general election.

=== Dunedin City Council, 2013–2016 ===
She challenged incumbent Dave Cull for the Dunedin mayoralty in the 2013 local body elections and also sought a seat on the Dunedin City Council. She contested these elections as an independent, unsure whether or not she was still a member of ACT. While Calvert had no previous local government experience, she finished second to Cull in the mayoral election and was elected to Council with the highest number of first-preference votes. She was a councillor on the Dunedin City Council until 2016.

=== Otago Regional Council, 2019–2022, 2025–present ===
In the 2019 local elections, she won a seat on the Otago Regional Council (ORC). While Calvert did not run for re-election to the Otago Regional Council during the 2022 regional election, she contested the 2025 regional election as part of the fiscally conservative Vision Otago ticket. In mid-October 2025, Calvert and incumbent councillors Michael Laws and Gary Kelliher were elected to the ORC on the Vision Otago ticket.

On 29 October 2025, Calvert was unanimously elected as chair of the Otago Regional Council. As chair of the ORC, Calvert implemented a new portfolio-based governance structure and assumed the strategy and customer portfolio alongside Laws. Calvert also voted in favour of including local Māori mana whenua in the ORC's decision-making process.

On 27 November 2025, Calvert advanced a resolution that the ORC commit to a draft annual work plan and budget with a zero increase in rates. The resolution passed by a margin of 10-1 with Green Cr Alan Somerville casting the sole opposing vote. In response to the Sixth National Government's announcement in late November 2025 that it would pass legislation to dissolve the regional councils and transfer their functions to district and municipal councils, Calvert supported the proposed restructure but expressed concern that Port Otago and its assets could be used to pay off other councils' debts. In April 2026, Calvert met with New Zealand First Member of Parliament Mark Patterson, who confirmed that the Government had abandoned plans to replace the regional councils with combined territories boards before the end of the 54th New Zealand Parliamentary term after consulting with local government bodies.

In mid-May 2026, Calvert and Laws expressed disagreement with Dunedin City councillors Lee Vandervis, Andrew Simms and Russell Lund's op-ed column in the Otago Daily Times proposing that a Dunedin-Waitaki authority take over control and management of Port Otago as part of the Sixth National Government's local government reforms. Calvert and Laws contended that Port Otago was a regional asset, with the former stating: "I would expect Otago people would fight hard to resist any ill-founded suggestion that whatever Dunedin City chooses to do they will be in a position to contra their rather large debts against more than their fair share of Port Otago." In October 2026, Calvert expressed concern that a proposed merger of the various Otago councils into one regional entity would lead to the domination of Dunedin and Queenstown in decision-making and the allocation of funding and resources.

On 9 October 2026, Calvert supported the Otago Regional Council's decision to cap the minimum bus fares for children and youth in Dunedin at NZ$1.50. She said it was important to encourage children and youth to attend schools and that the Council should lobby the central government to help subsidise school bus travel fares.

== Views and perspectives ==
Calvert does not agree with attempts to ban farming chickens in cages, saying "We care about people ahead of silly little chickens."
