= 2025 Ngāti Kahungunu iwi elections =

- 24 April 2025
- Registered: 23,489
- Turnout: 4,789 (20.39%)
- Chairperson election
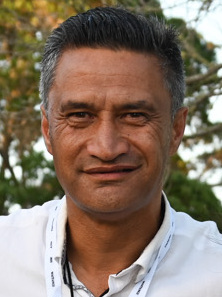

| Candidate | Bayden Barber | Thompson Hokianga |
| Popular vote | 2,973 | 1,734 |
| Percentage | 62.08% | 36.21% |
- Board election
- 10 seats on the Ngāti Kahungunu Iwi Incorporated board (including chair and kaumatua)
| Party | Seats | +/– |
|---|---|---|
| Nonpartisan | 10 | 0 |
This lists parties that won seats. See the complete results below.

The 2025 Ngāti Kahungunu iwi elections were elections held on 24 April to elect the board members of Ngāti Kahungunu Iwi Incorporated, the governing body of Ngāti Kahungunu iwi. The electorate consisted of Māori who whakapapa to the iwi, a group primarily found residing on the east coast of New Zealand's North Island, including Hawke's Bay and the Wairarapa.

Ten board members were elected; six to represent those residing in the iwi's rohe, two to represent those residing elsewhere, one to represent kaumātua, and one chairperson.

Incumbent chairperson Bayden Barber defeated Thompson Hokianga.

== Key dates ==
Key dates relating to the iwi elections were as follows:

| 2 February | Emails were sent to eligible-to-stand iwi members |
| 3 February | Candidate nominations opened |
| 28 February | Candidate nominations closed at noon |
| 4 March | Public notice of candidates released |
| 24 March | Voting mailers sent out. Start of special voting period |
| 17 April | Voter registration closed |
| 24 April | Election day – voting closed at noon. Special general meeting held at 4:30pm |
| 1 May | Declaration of results |
| 1 June | Voting papers destroyed |

== Background ==
=== Iwi finances ===
Total income for the iwi had grown from under $4 million in 2020 to $30 million in 2024. The foundation of this was the settlement of the iwi's treaty claims. The iwi has interests in fishing and farming activity across the east coast.

== Campaign ==
=== Chairperson election ===
Incumbent chairperson Bayden Barber stood for re-election, he would face his deputy Thompson Hokianga for the position. Former chairperson Ngāhiwi Tōmoana said that the challenge between the two was a sign that the iwi was strong and that the future was brighter for them.

==== Bayden Barber ====
Barber was elected chairperson in 2022. He said that following that election he "walked straight into some huge challenges", including the closure of Takitimu Seafoods due to commercial non-viability, which saw the loss of 33 jobs. He said the iwi's response to Cyclone Gabrielle had been painful and slow, but that they were "getting there". He listed as achievements stabilising the commercial interests of the iwi, building 90 cabins following the cyclone, and delivering $5 million in scholarships to high school and university students. Barber said that it was important for people to vote as the iwi was one of the few in the country with direct election of the chairperson. He said that the incumbent National-led coalition government was "difficult" to deal with, and that he wanted to focus on more social issues like housing and employment and also environmental issues. Te reo Māori and education for the iwi was also important.

==== Thompson Hokianga ====
Hokianga, an academic, was an incumbent Hawke's Bay regional councillor, representing the Māui ki te Tonga Māori constituency. For the sixteen years prior to the election, Hokianga had gained governance experience both on the regional council and the New Zealand Māori Council. His academic career involved work in marine biology, mātauranga Māori, and freshwater management. He has five children and was born and raised in the iwi. His father's marae is Rongomareroa in Pōrangahau and Kahuranaki in Te Hauke, and his mother's is Mangaroa in Bridge Pā.

Hokianga identified recovery from Cyclone Gabrielle, economic growth for the iwi in a sustainable way, and dealing with the incumbent National-led government as key issues.

== List of candidates ==
The following people stood for election to the iwi board:

| Position | | Name | Notes |
|---|---|---|---|
| Chairperson | | Bayden Barber | |
| Chairperson | | Thompson Hokianga | |
| Kaumātua | | Orine Gillies | |
| Kaumātua | | Cordry Tawa Huata | |
| Member | Wairoa | Katarena Edwards | |
| Member | Wairoa | Kurawari Panera | |
| Member | Wairoa | Esta Wainohu-Marcum | |
| Member | Heretaunga | Crystal Edwards | |
| Member | Heretaunga | Thompson Hokianga | |
| Member | Tamatea | Jenny Nelson-Smith | |
| Member | Tamatea | Tracey Snee-Ngarotata | |
| Member | Tamatea | Anthony Tipene-Matua | |
| Member | Taurahere Runanga - Northern | Te Aihurangi Tangiora | elected unopposed |
| Member | Taurahere Runanga - Southern | Brian Ruawai-Hamilton | elected unopposed |
| Member | Te Whanganui-a-Orotu | George Reti | elected unopposed |
| Member | Tamaki Nui A Rua | Hayden Hape | elected unopposed |
| Member | Wairarapa | Melissa Ihaka | elected unopposed |

== Results ==
=== Chairperson ===
2025 Ngāti Kahungunui Iwi Inc. chairman election
| Party | Candidate | Votes | % | ±% |
|---|---|---|---|---|
| Non-partisan | Bayden Barber^{†} | 2,973 | 62.08 | |
| Non-partisan | Thompson Hokianga | 1,734 | 36.21 | (new) |
| Informal votes | | 1 | 0.02 | |
| Blank votes | | 81 | 1.69 | |
| Turnout | | 4,789 | 20.39 | |
| Registered electors | | 23,489 | | |
| Barber hold | | | | |
^{†} incumbent

=== Kaumātua ===
Cordry Tawa Huata was elected kaumātua whilst runner-up Orine Gillies was elected alternate kaumātua.

2025 Ngāti Kahungunui Iwi Inc. kaumātua election
| Party | Candidate | Votes | % | ±% |
|---|---|---|---|---|
| Non-partisan | Cordry Tawa Huata | 659 | 50.77 | |
| Non-partisan | Orine Gillies | 543 | 41.83 | |
| Informal votes | | 2 | 0.15 | |
| Blank votes | | 94 | 7.24 | |
| Turnout | | 1,298 | | |
| Registered electors | | | | |

=== Other board members ===
==== Wairoa ====
Esta Wainohu was elected as the representative of Wairoa Taiwhenua, whilst runner-up Katarena Edwards was elected the alternate.

Wairoa Taiwhenua
| Party | Candidate | Votes | % | ±% |
|---|---|---|---|---|
| Non-partisan | Esta Wainohu | 576 | 49.53 | |
| Non-partisan | Katarena Edwards | 287 | 24.68 | |
| Non-partisan | Kurawari Panera | 239 | 20.55 | |
| Informal votes | | 0 | 0.00 | |
| Blank votes | | 61 | 5.25 | |
| Turnout | | 1,163 | | |
| Registered electors | | | | |

==== Heretaunga ====
Crystal Edwards was elected as the representative of Taiwhenua o Heretaunga, whilst runner-up Thompson Hokianga was elected the alternate.

Taiwhenua o Heretaunga
| Party | Candidate | Votes | % | ±% |
|---|---|---|---|---|
| Non-partisan | Crystal Edwards | 1,195 | 55.38 | |
| Non-partisan | Thompson Hokianga | 881 | 40.82 | |
| Informal votes | | 1 | 0.05 | |
| Blank votes | | 81 | 3.75 | |
| Turnout | | 2,158 | | |
| Registered electors | | | | |

==== Tamatea ====
Anthony Tipene-Matua was elected as the representative of Taiwhenua o Tamatea, whilst runner-up Tracey Snee-Ngarotata was elected the alternate.

Taiwhenua o Heretaunga
| Party | Candidate | Votes | % | ±% |
|---|---|---|---|---|
| Non-partisan | Anthony Tipene-Matua | 173 | 40.80 | |
| Non-partisan | Tracey Snee-Ngarotata | 158 | 37.26 | |
| Non-partisan | Jenny Nelson-Smith | 77 | 18.16 | |
| Informal votes | | 0 | 0.00 | |
| Blank votes | | 16 | 3.77 | |
| Turnout | | 424 | | |
| Registered electors | | | | |
