= Vision Otago =

Electoral ticket in Otago

Vision Otago is a fiscally conservative local body ticket on the Otago Regional Council (ORC). It was established in August 2025 on a platform of reducing rates and "restoring" local democracy. During the 2025 Otago Regional Council election which concluded on 11 October 2025, three Vision Otago candidates were elected to the ORC; former ACT Party Member of Parliament Hilary Calvert and incumbent councillors Michael Laws and Gary Kelliher.

== Policies ==
Vision Otago has released a ten-point plan which consists of:

- Reducing regional rates by cutting staff numbers and salary increases and prioritising "frontline delivery" and regional priorities.
- Improving freshwater quality.
- Protecting and restoring lakes by combating invasive species.
- Overhauling pest management policies.
- Offering better public transport alternatives and reinstating free school-hour bus travels for under-18 year olds.
- Increasing local government input in the resource consenting process.
- Reviewing staffing arrangements at the Otago Regional Council's headquarters in Dunedin.
- Prioritising the monitoring of territorial authority-run wastewater management plants.
- Supporting Otago's nomination to become New Zealand's first UNESCO Biosphere Reserve.
- Rebuilding trust in local democracy by facilitating public input and "restoring confidence" with central government, industry and the wider public.

== History ==
=== Launch and 2025 regional election ===
On 17 August 2025, the Vision Otago ticket was launched to contest the 2025 Otago Regional Council election on a platform of reducing rates, overhauling the Otago Regional Council's bureaucracy, spending priorities, pest management, and public transportation policies. Vision Otago also advocated restoring local democracy and increasing public input in the Council's policy-making process. Vision Otago named five candidates including former ACT Party MP and Dunedin City councillor Hilary Calvert in the Dunedin ward, former ORC councillor Carmen Hope in the Molyneux ward, Wanaka businesswoman Nicky Rhodes, and incumbent ORC councillors Gary Kelliher and Michael Laws in the Dunstan ward. Vision Otago also launched a website and Facebook account to promote its policies and candidates.

In early September 2025, Vision Otago launched its rates and finance policy, pledging to "reduce rates, not hold them" during their first council term. The group objected to the significant rates increases over the past five years; with ORC regional rates rising to 48.5 percent in 2021, 18 percent in 2022, 18.8 percent in 2023, 16.6 percent in 2024 and 5.5 percent in 2025. While campaigning, Dunstan candidate Laws criticised the ORC for allegedly allowing rates and expenditure to increase exponentially in recent years by doubling staff numbers and overspending on the Council's new Dunedin headquarters.

On 21 September, Dunstan candidate Kelliher proposed reducing the ORC's staff numbers from 360 to 300 personnel over the next three years, claiming it would save NZ$9 million. Kelliher and Laws also advocated using the NZ$15 million annual dividend from the ORC-run Port Otago to offset costs and improve efficiency. Fellow Dunstan candidate Rhodes argued that rate rises were unsustainable for those on fixed incomes particularly pensioners. Laws, Kelliher and Rhodes also welcomed the Local Government Commission's decision to grant the Dunstan constituency a fourth seat on the Otago Regional Council, saying it would increase provincial and rural Otago's voice at local government representation.

Following the release of the ORC's annual report in mid September 2025, Laws criticised the council's decision to raise staff salaries by 5 percent in the 2023-2024 financial year and 4.5% in 2024-2025 financial year, blaming them for regional rate increases. In addition, Kelliher reiterated Vision Otago's policy of slashing automatic wage increases and reviewing staff numbers.

Based on preliminary results released on 11 October 2025, Calvert, Kelliher and Laws were elected onto the Otago Regional Council on the Vision Otago ticket. Fellow Vision Otago candidates Hope and Rhodes failed to secure seats in the Dunstan and Molyneaux wards. Final results released on 18 October confirmed the election of Calbert, Kelliher and Laws.

=== First term, 2025–present ===
On 29 October, Calvert was unanimously elected as chair of the Otago Regional Council. Fellow Vision Otago councillor Laws declined the role of Council chair since the role was based in Dunedin and he had work commitments elsewhere. On 6 November 2025, Calvert announced an overhaul of the ORC's governance structure, replacing the previous committee-based structure with a portfolio-based structure with councillors serving as portfolio leads. While Calvert expressed an openness to including local Māori mana whenua input in the portfolio structure's decision-making process, Laws opposed mana whenua representation on the grounds they lacked a democratic mandate. Former ORC chair Gretchen Robertson and Green councillor Alan Somerville expressed reservations that the new portfolio governance structure would limit the Council's mana whenua engagement.

The ORC voted by a margin of 9 to 2 votes to adopt the new portfolio governance structure; with all three Vision Otago councillors supporting the motion. That same day, the ORC voted by a margin of 8 to 3 votes to consult with mana whenua on incorporating representation into the new portfolio structure; with Calvert supporting the motion and Laws and Kelliher opposing it. During the 2025–2028 term, Kelliher was appointed to the science and resilience portfolio while Calvert and Laws were appointed to the strategy and customer portfolio. Calvert and Kelliher were also appointed to the ORC's audit and risk committee.

On 27 November 2025, Calvert advanced a resolution that the ORC commit to a draft annual work plan and budget with a zero rates increase. The resolution passed by a margin of 10-1 with the support of Calvert and her Vision Otago colleagues Laws and Kelliher.

Following the Sixth National Government's proposal in late November 2026 to abolish the regional councils and replaced them with "combined territories boards," Laws and Calvert expressed support for abolishing the regional councils but insisted that the Council-owned Port Otago remain an asset for the entire Otago region rather than being reallocated to Dunedin. By mid February 2026, Laws had changed his position, rejected the "combined territories boards" proposal as unworkable and instead favouring having two separate coastal and inland regional authorities in Otago. In late April 2026, Calbert confirmed that the central government had abandoned plans to establish "combined territories boards" following a meeting with New Zealand First cabinet minister Mark Patterson. In early May, the Government issued a three-month deadline for councils to develop amalgamation plans but excluded regional councils from participating.
