= 2025 Otago Regional Council election =

New Zealand local election

- 11 October 2025
- Turnout: 80,628 (47.2%)
- 12 seats on the Otago Regional Council; 7 seats needed for a majority
| Party | Vote % | Seats | +/– |
|---|---|---|---|
| Independent | 49.69 | 7 | −4 |
| Vision Otago | 23.73 | 3 | +3 |
| Green | 7.88 | 1 | 0 |
| ACT Local | 4.77 | 1 | +1 |
This lists parties that won seats. See the complete results below.

The 2025 Otago Regional Council election was a local election held from 9 September to 11 October in the Otago region of New Zealand, as part of that year's regional council elections and other local elections held nation-wide.

Voters elected 12 regional councillors for the 2025–2028 term of the Otago Regional Council. Postal voting and the single transferable vote system were used.

== Key dates ==
- 4 July 2025: Nominations for candidates opened.
- 1 August 2025: Nominations for candidates closed at 12pm.
- 9 September 2025: Voting documents were posted and voting opened.
- 11 October 2025: Voting closed at 12pm and preliminary results released.
- 17–19 October 2025: Final results will be declared.

== Background ==
=== Representation review ===
Following a representation review, the Otago Regional Council will be made up from 12 councillors elected from four constituencies for the 2025–2028 term: Dunedin (five councillors), Dunstan (four councillors), Molyneux (two councillors) and Moeraki (one councillor). This will be one less councillor representing Dunedin and one more councillor representing Dunstan compared to the 2022–2025 term.

The council also determined to switch from first past the post voting and instead hold this election using the single transferable vote (STV) method.

=== Parties and tickets ===
In late May 2025, the Green Party of Aotearoa New Zealand confirmed it would be running several candidates in the 2025 Otago Regional Council, Dunedin mayoral and Dunedin City Council elections. Incumbent Alan Somerville is standing on the party ticket and incumbent Elliot Weir is standing as a Green-endorsed independent.

In mid August 2025, the Vision Otago ticket was formed on a platform of reducing local government rates. Members of Vision Otago included former MP and councillor Hilary Calvert (Dunedin), Carmen Hope (Molyneux), Cr Michael Laws, Cr Gary Kelliher and Nicky Rhodes in the Dunstan ward.

== List of candidates ==
=== Incumbents not seeking re-election ===
- Cr Alexa Forbes of the Dunstan constituency confirmed on 22 May 2025 that they would not be seeking re-election.
- Cr Bryan Scott of the Dunedin constituency vacated his seat in October 2024.

=== Councillors ===
==== Dunedin constituency ====
The Dunedin constituency returned five councillors to the regional council.

| Candidate | Affiliation (Note: A candidate may leave their affiliation blank, run as an independent, or run with an affiliation to an organisation, local body ticket or political party. Otago Regional Council does not allow whānau, hapū, or iwi details to be used for the affiliation.) | Notes |
|---|---|---|
| Hilary Calvert | Vision Otago | Former ACT MP and Otago regional councillor (2019–2022) |
| James Cockle | The Radical Action Faction | |
| Chanel Gardner | None | |
| Phil Glassey | Independent | |
| Alex King | None | |
| Tim Mepham | Independent | Incumbent councillor |
| Andrew Noone | Independent | Incumbent councillor |
| Gretchen Robertson | None | Chairwoman and incumbent councillor |
| Alan Somerville | Green | Incumbent councillor |
| Elliot Weir | Independent | Incumbent councillor. Green Party endorsed. |

==== Dunstan constituency ====
The Dunstan constituency returned four councillors to the regional council.

| Candidate | Affiliation | Notes |
|---|---|---|
| Ben Farrell | None | |
| Neil Gillespie | None | Incumbent deputy mayor of the Central Otago District Council |
| Matt Hollyer | None | AJ Hackett Bungy NZ project and innovation manager and conservationist |
| Gary Kelliher | Vision Otago | Incumbent councillor |
| Michael Laws | Vision Otago | Incumbent councillor |
| Amie Pont | Independent | |
| Nicky Rhodes | Vision Otago | |

==== Moeraki constituency ====
The Moeraki constituency returned one councillor to the regional council.

| Candidate | Affiliation | Notes |
|---|---|---|
| Sophia Leon de la Barra | None | |
| Kevin Malcolm | None | Incumbent councillor and former Waitaki District Councillor |

==== Molyneux constituency ====
The Molyneux constituency returned two councillors to the regional council.

| Candidate | Affiliation | Notes |
|---|---|---|
| Robbie Byars | ACT Local | Dairy farmer |
| Carmen Hope | Vision Otago | |
| Lloyd McCall | None | Incumbent councillor |
| Kate Wilson | None | Incumbent councillor |

== Results ==
=== Dunstan constituency ===
Dunstan constituency
| Affiliation | Candidate | Primary vote | % | +/− | Iteration vote (Note: Rounded to whole number) | |
|---|---|---|---|---|---|---|
| Vision Otago | Michael Laws | 5,930 | 26.15 | n/a | #1 | 5,930 |
| Vision Otago | Gary Kelliher | 3,616 | 15.94 | n/a | #2 | 4,451 |
| Independent | Matt Hollyer | 3,516 | 15.50 | (new) | #4 | 4,269 |
| Independent | Neil Gillespie | 2,733 | 12.05 | (new) | #6 | 3,899 |
| Independent | Ben Farrell | 2,472 | 10.90 | (new) | #6 | 3,503 |
| Independent | Amie Pont | 1,571 | 6.93 | (new) | #3 | 1,888 |
| Vision Otago | Nicky Rhodes | 731 | 3.22 | (new) | #2 | 986 |
| Quota | | 4,114 | 18.14 | n/a | #6 | 3,836 |
| Informal | | 741 | 3.27 | +2.77 | | |
| Blank | | 1,368 | 6.03 | −0.99 | | |
| Turnout | | 22,678 | (46.43) | (+1.00) | | |
| Registered | | 48,840 | | | | |
| Vision Otago gain from Independent (Note: Incumbent changed affiliation) on 1st iteration | | | | | | |
| Vision Otago gain from Independent on 2nd iteration | | | | | | |
| Independent gain from Independent on 4th iteration | | | | | | |
| Independent win (new seat) on 6th iteration | | | | | | |
incumbent

=== Moeraki constituency ===
Moeraki constituency
| Affiliation | Candidate | Primary vote | % | +/− |
|---|---|---|---|---|
| Independent | Kevin Malcolm | 4,742 | 59.00 | n/a |
| Independent | Sophia Leon de la Barra | 2,567 | 31.94 | (new) |
| Quota | | 3,655 | 45.48 | n/a |
| Informal | | 9 | 0.11 | n/a |
| Blank | | 719 | 8.95 | n/a |
| Turnout | | 8,037 | (53.15) | n/a |
| Registered | | 15,121 | | |
| Independent hold on 1st iteration | | | | |
incumbent

=== Molyneux constituency ===
Molyneux constituency
| Affiliation | Candidate | Primary vote | % | +/− | Iteration vote | |
|---|---|---|---|---|---|---|
| ACT Local | Robbie Byars | 3,845 | 26.56 | (new) | #2 | 4,503 |
| Independent | Kate Wilson | 3,579 | 24.73 | n/a | #2 | 4,258 |
| Independent | Lloyd McCall | 2,672 | 18.46 | n/a | #2 | 3,112 |
| Vision Otago | Carmen Hope | 2,187 | 15.11 | n/a | #1 | 2,187 |
| Quota | | 4,094 | 28.28 | n/a | #2 | 3,958 |
| Informal | | 220 | 1.52 | +0.71 | | |
| Blank | | 1,972 | 13.62 | +0.28 | | |
| Turnout | | 14,475 | (53.12) | (−2.41) | | |
| Registered | | 27,252 | | | | |
| ACT Local gain from Independent on 2nd iteration | | | | | | |
| Independent hold on 2nd iteration | | | | | | |
incumbent

=== Dunedin constituency ===
Dunedin constituency
| Affiliation | Candidate | Primary vote | % | +/− | Iteration vote | |
|---|---|---|---|---|---|---|
| Vision Otago | Hilary Calvert | 6,646 | 18.81 | (new) | #1 | 6,646 |
| Independent | Andrew Noone | 4,866 | 13.77 | n/a | #2 | 5,280 |
| Independent | Gretchen Robinson | 4,030 | 11.40 | n/a | #7 | 4,884 |
| Independent | Chanel Gardner | 3,244 | 9.18 | (new) | #9 | 4,716 |
| Green | Alan Somerville | 3,107 | 8.79 | n/a | #14 | 4,635 |
| Independent Green | Elliot Weir | 3,238 | 9.16 | n/a | #14 | 4,469 |
| Independent | Tim Mepham | 1,739 | 4.92 | n/a | #7 | 2,299 |
| Independent | Phil Glassey | 1,307 | 3.70 | (new) | #6 | 1,833 |
| The Radical Action Faction | James Cockle | 1,108 | 3.14 | n/a | #4 | 1,248 |
| Independent | Alex King | 977 | 2.76 | (new) | #3 | 1,019 |
| Quota | | 5,044 | 14.27 | n/a | #14 | 4,611 |
| Informal | | 353 | 1.00 | +0.11 | | |
| Blank | | 4,725 | 13.37 | +3.05 | | |
| Turnout | | 35,340 | (44.31) | (−4.17) | | |
| Registered | | 79,753 | | | | |
| Vision Otago gain from Independent on 1st iteration | | | | | | |
| Independent hold on 2nd iteration | | | | | | |
| Independent hold on 7thiteration | | | | | | |
| Independent gain from Independent on 9th iteration | | | | | | |
| Green hold on 14th iteration | | | | | | |
incumbent

== See also ==
- 2025 Dunedin City Council election
- 2025 Dunedin mayoral election
- 2025 Queenstown-Lakes District Council election
