= Otago Regional Council =

Regional council in New Zealand

Coordinates: 45°26′S 169°50′E

Otago Regional Council Kaunihera ā-Rohe o Otago

Type
- Type: Regional Council of Otago

History
- Founded: 6 March 1989

Leadership
- Chairperson: Hilary Calvert, Vision Otago since October 2025
- Deputy Chair: Kevin Malcolm

Structure
- Seats: 12
- Political groups: Independent (7); Vision Otago (3); Green (1); ACT Local (1)
- Length of term: 3 years

Elections
- Voting system: Single Transferable Vote
- Last election: 11 October 2025
- Next election: October 2028

Meeting place
- Aonui–Otago Regional Council Head Office, 180 High Street, Dunedin

Website
- orc.govt.nz

Otago Regional Council (ORC) is the regional council for Otago in the South Island of New Zealand. The council's principal office is the Aonui Head Office on High Street in Dunedin, with smaller offices in Queenstown and Alexandra. They are responsible for sustainably managing Otago's natural resources of land, air and water on behalf of the community. Property owners pay rates to both the local and regional councils (e.g. the Dunedin City Council and Otago Regional Council).

== Composition ==
The Otago Regional Council consists of 12 members elected from 4 constituencies. Dunedin (5), Dunstan (4), Molyneux (2) and Moeraki (1).

Members of the Otago Regional Council (following 2025 election)
Name	Affiliation	Constituency	First elected	Notes
Robbie Byars	ACT Local	Molyneux	2025	
Hilary Calvert	Vision Otago	Dunedin	2022, 2025	Incumbent chair and previously served on the Council between 2019 and 2022.
Neil Gillespie	Independent	Dunstan	2025	Former deputy mayor of the Central Otago District Council.
Chanel Gardner	Independent	Dunedin	2025	
Matt Hollyer	Independent	Dunstan	2025	
Gary Kelliher	Vision Otago	Dunstan	2013, 2019	Lost seat in 2016
Michael Laws	Vision Otago	Dunstan	2016	
Kevin Malcolm	Independent	Moeraki	2019	Deputy Chair (2025–)
Andrew Noone	Independent	Dunedin	2016	
Gretchen Robertson	Independent	Dunedin	2004	Chairperson (2022–2025)
Alan Somerville	Green	Dunedin	2022	
Kate Wilson	Independent	Molyneux	2019	

Otago regional councillors are elected for three-year terms. The 2025 election saw the return of Hilary Calvert under the Vision Otago ticket, and the election of four new councillors: ACT Local candidate Robbie Byars and independent candidates Chanel Gardner, Matt Hollyer, and Neil Gillespie.

== Constituencies ==
Constituency	Population	Description / Notes
Dunedin	110,000	As of 2019, Dunedin remains by far the largest in terms of population with approx. 110,800 people living inside of its boundaries as of 2019 which covers Central Dunedin, Saddle Hill and the Otago Peninsula with 6 representatives total (about half of the total council).
Dunstan	57,000	Dunstan consists of the Queenstown Lakes and Central Otago districts with a total population of approximately 57,400 as of 2019 and 3 councillors.
Molyneux	35,000	Molyneux consists of the Clutha District territorial area, and Mosgiel-Taieri with a population of ~35,000 as of 2019 and 2 councillors.
Moeraki	20,400	Moeraki covers a portion of the Waitaki District and significantly both the Oamaru and Waihemo wards, and part of the Corriedale and Ahuriri wards, with a population of 20,400 as of 2019 and 1 councillors. Kevin Malcolm who was elected unanimously in 2022 due to a lack of opposing candidates.

== Responsibilities ==
The responsibilities of the Otago Regional Council are the same as other Regional Councils in New Zealand, but for the Otago region. The responsibilities include:

- Protecting Otago's environment, including but not limited to rivers, freshwater, air, coastal waters, and land.
- Managing and preventing marine pollution and oil spills.
- Preparedness for Civil Defence across the Otago Region, including floods and earthquakes.
- Transport planning and passenger services across the region.
- Ensuring general regional well-being.

== Assets ==
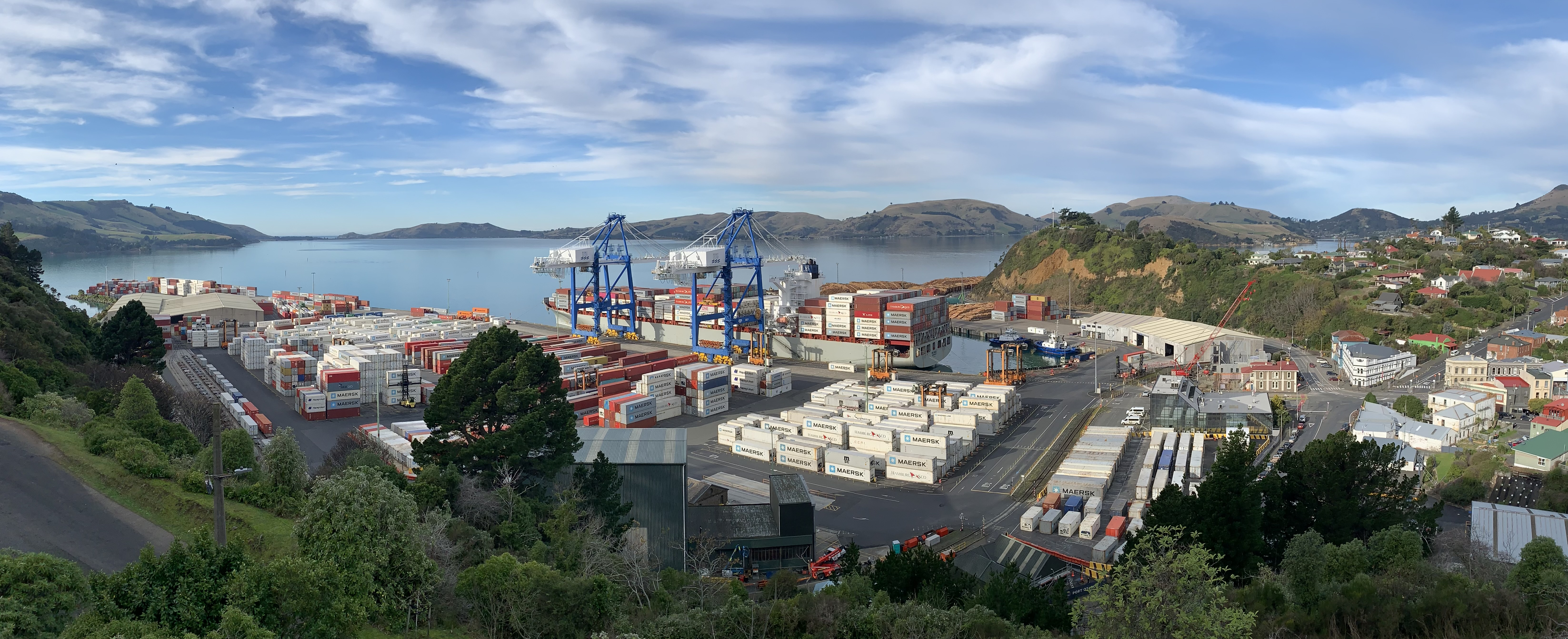
Port Chalmers, one of the components of the Council-owned Port Otago entity.

In the Otago Regional Council's annual report, containing the council's financial report from 2021 to 2022, the Otago Regional Council states that the council has $964.3m in total assets, exceeding their budgeted amount by $225m.

=== Port Otago ===
The council's most valuable asset is Port Otago, which is 100% owned by the Council. Port Otago is located in the Otago Harbour in Dunedin and serves as the primary export port for the lower South Island. It consists of a deep container port at Port Chalmers and a bulk port in Dunedin, with two wharf-side cold storage facilities. Port Otago also owns property businesses in Dunedin, Auckland and Hamilton.

Prior to the 1989 New Zealand local government reforms, Port Otago and 400 harbourside properties was owned by Dunedin. As part of the local government reforms, the newly-formed Otago Regional Council gained control of Port Otago. During the 2024-25 financial profit, Port Otago delivered a net profit after tax of NZ$64.6 million and contributed NZ$18 million in revenue to the ORC.

=== Headquarters ===
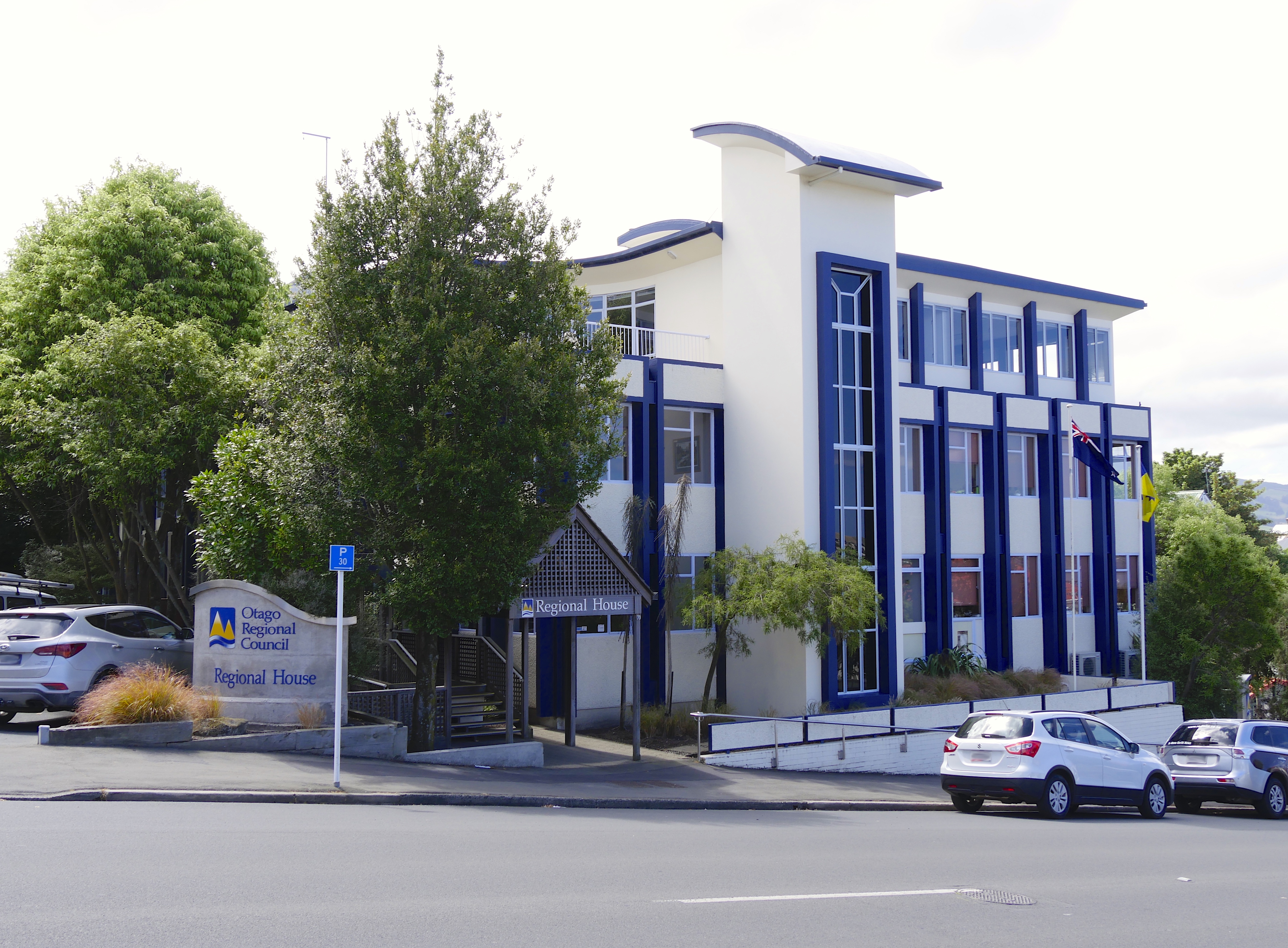
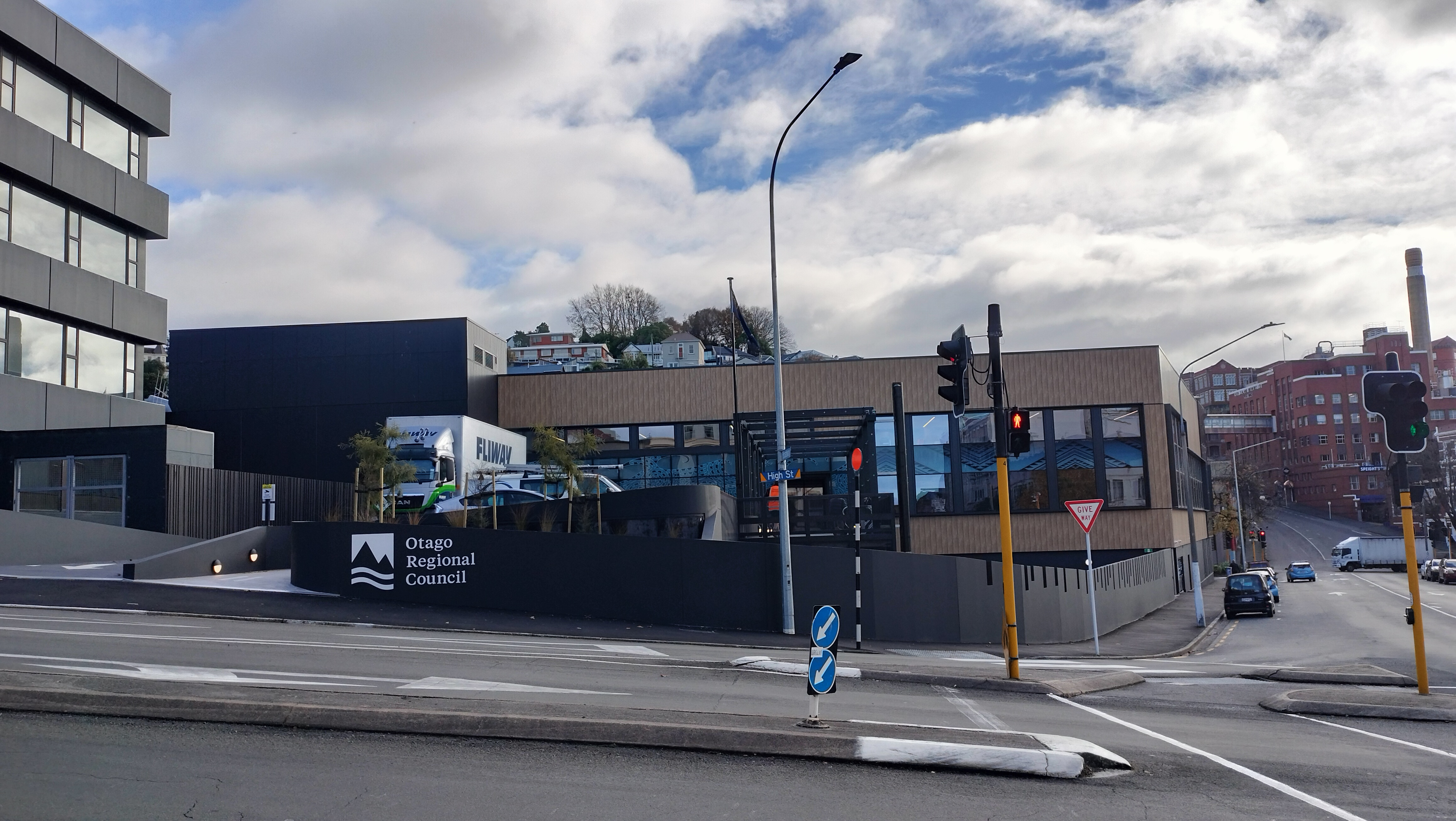
The former Otago Regional Council headquarters at Regional House on Stafford Street and their new Aonui headquarters on High Street.

The Otago Regional Council's headquarters was formerly based at Stafford Street in Dunedin until mid-April 2026, when it relocated to a new purpose built-site on Maclaggan Street. Prior to the relocation, the Council's 300 staff operated from three sites in Dunedin. On 15 June 2021, Port Otago's property arm purchased The Warehouse Group's former central Dunedin department store on Maclaggan Street for NZ$10.2 million, which it intended to redevelop as the ORC's new headquarters.

In February 2023, the Otago Regional Council released plans about its new Maclaggan Street site, which would be known as "Whare Rūnaka" and cost about NZ$45 million. Under the leasing arrangement, the ORC would be a long term tenant, starting with a 20-year lease followed by two 10-year right-of-renewals leases at market rental, with any surplus earnings from the rental being returned to the Council via a dividend. While most Councillors approved the plan, Dunstan–based councillor Michael Laws opposed the new Maclaggan headquarters due to a projected 18.3% rates rise for 2023/24 and an alleged Dunedin-centric focus. The ORC's new Aonui headquarters on Maclaggan and High Street opened to the public on late April 2026, with the total cost of construction reaching NZ$56 million. The new building featured a large front-of-house area, an open-plan office space with desk island formations, breakout interview rooms and soundproof booths.

== History ==
The Otago Regional Council was established as part of the 1989 New Zealand local government reforms, which created the present two-tier system of regional councils and territorial authorities. The newly-formed ORC also gained ownership of Port Otago, which had previously been managed by Dunedin.

=== 2019 Skelton report ===
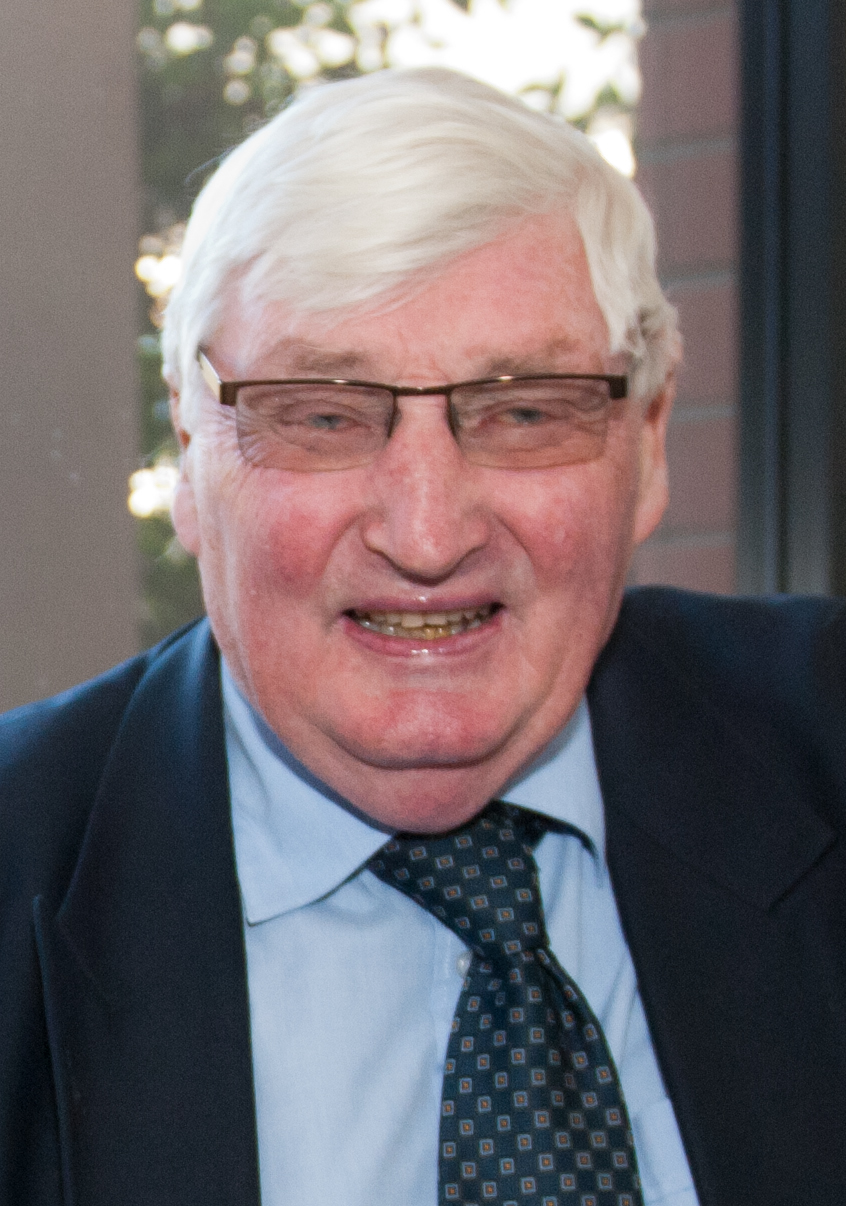
Sir Peter Skelton, author of the Skelton report

On 19 May 2019, the Government launched an investigation into the Otago Regional Council, analysing the council's ability to deal with incoming water permit replacement applications as a result of the century-old water permits being replaced with Resource Management Act (RMA) consents. This investigation took place after a council report was leaked to the media which detailed concerns about the council's lack of ability to deal with new water permit applications, which the Minister for the Environment David Parker summarised in a letter to the then Chairperson Marian Hobbs which stated that Professor Peter Skelton concluded that "the Otago Region does not have a fit for purpose planning framework in place" to deal with incoming water permits. Along with this conclusion, the Minister made a series of recommendations to the council including a fully developed freshwater management planning regime to assess water consent applications, to develop and initiate a "programme of work" which would fully review the RPS by November 2020 and a refurbished and original Land and Water Regional Plan (LWRP), and finally for the Otago Regional Council to develop a plan change to provide an appropriate "interim planning and consenting framework" which would manage freshwater until allocation limits are set up.

In the report, David Parker expressed disagreement with Professor Skelton's recommendation that he begins a process to change the date for expiry of specific deemed permits until 2025. Later, the date for expiry of water permits and discharge permits was reached and on 1 October 2022, the 30th anniversary of the Resource Management Act, they officially expired.

=== 2020 leadership change ===
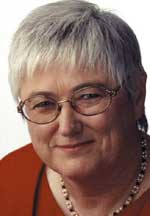
Marian Hobbs, Chair of the Otago Regional Council (2019-2020)

After the 2019 election, on 23 October 2019, former minister of the environment Marian Hobbs was confirmed as the chair of the newly elected Council through a majority vote by her fellow councillors. Hobbs attracted criticism from her fellow Councillors after she wrote to Minister for the Environment David Parker during the national COVID-19 lockdown asked him whether or not he would consider appointing a commissioner to the Council if she lost a vote on policy implementation.

Marian Hobbs before her sacking as chairwoman had on multiple occasions affirmed that she would not step down willingly and although she did declare "my chances are nil" when asked about her possibly retaining the position, she instead wanted the public to witness the removal of her as chairwoman. Her position was not completely unfounded, as it is thought that a comfortable majority of councillors already supported new leadership.

On 15 June 2020, nine of the Councillors wrote to the Chief Executive, asking for an extraordinary meeting to be called to remove Hobbs as chair. An extraordinary meeting of the council was subsequently called for on 8 July 2021, where she made an opening statement including "I was too effective in pushing the water reforms" and that "she would not back away from arguing for the environment". It was clear that she had lost the support of the council and she was removed as chair through a majority vote (9–2). Andrew Noone was then elected unopposed as Chair and stood successfully for re-election in 2022 in the Dunedin Constituency. Marian Hobbs resigned on 1 November 2021, and did not stand for re-election in the 2022 local elections.

=== 2022 rates rise ===
In June 2022 the council approved an annual plan of $109m for 2022–2023 with an 18% rates rise.

=== 2023–2024 freshwater management dispute ===
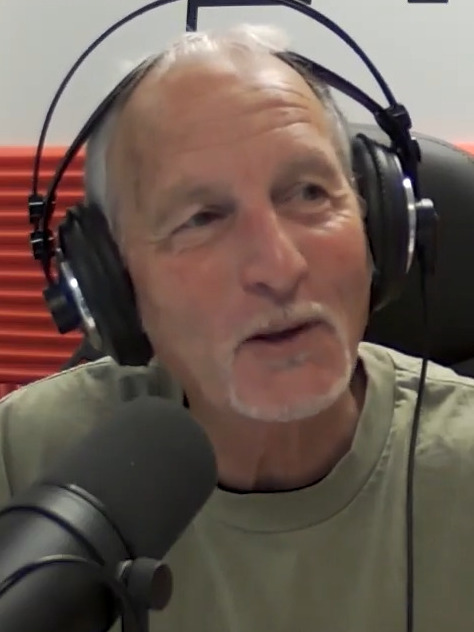
Michael Laws, incumbent ORC councillor since 2016.

In mid December 2023, the Otago Regional Council decided to continue work on its freshwater management policy despite a change in government following the 2023 New Zealand general election. ORC chairwoman Gretchen Robertson said the council would aim to notify the Government about its land and water plan by 30 June 2024. RMA Minister Chris Bishop disagreed with the ORC's decision, stating that the National-led coalition government had extended the deadline for councils to submit their revised plans to 31 December 2027 in order to accommodate the Government's planned changes to RMA legislation and scrapping of the previous Labour Government's National Policy Statement for Freshwater Management 2020.

In mid-February 2024 Councillors Robertson, deputy Chairman Cr Lloyd McCall and senior ORC staff met with RMA Reform Minister Bishop, Environment Minister Penny Simmonds and Agriculture Minister Todd McClay to discuss how the Government's plans to overhaul national freshwater management policies would affect the council's land and water management plan. The Ministers reiterated the Government's message that the ORC stop work on its plan and adapt to its planned changes. On 22 February, the ORC voted by a margin of 8–4 to continue working on its land and water plan despite the Government's new directive. While Robertson welcomed the majority vote as a sign that the council was mature and not divided, Crs Michael Laws and Gary Kelliher warned that the council's vote could give Simmonds justification to dissolve the council and install government-appointed commissioners. Cr Alan Somervile said that the council's vote was not about opposing the Government but was rather about "looking after the environment."

During the Easter Weekend in late March 2024, the ORC notified its regional policy statement in after voting on 32 recommendations from an independent hearings panel during a closed doors meeting. The regional policy statement is an overall policy framework that governs the management of Otago's natural environment including its land and water plan. Crs Law and Kelliher objected to the council's decision-making occurring behind closed doors. The Council defended its decision to exclude the public from the meeting on the grounds that the hearing panel's report and recommendations were subject to appeals. In late March 2024, the Council voted by a margin of 7–5 to notify its land and water plan by 31 October 2024. Labour Party Members of Parliament Ingrid Leary and Rachel Brooking and environmental groups praised the council for taking steps to protect Otago's waterways. By contrast, Federated Farmers criticised the council's decision and urged the Government to "do more to stop councils from continuing to implement important freshwater rules ahead of freshwater reforms."

On 20 September 2024, the ORC voted during an extraordinary public meeting to continue on the council's land and water regional plan despite government ministers Simmonds and McClay advising that they pause until the National-led government issued its updated national freshwater management policy statement. Councillor Kevin Malcolm had submitted a motion recommended that the Council pause their land and water plan until the Government issued its updated plan. Malcolm was supported by four other councillors including Crs Gary Kelliher and Michael Laws. Malcolm's motion was defeated by a margin of 7 to 5. Opponents of the motion including Cr Alexa Forbes argued for the continuation of the land and water management plan since it had already cost NZ$18 million while Cr Elliot Weir described pausing the plan as "terrible." In response, Simmonds reiterated the government's commitment to reforming the national freshwater policy statement and the Resource Management Act system. Councillors are expected to meet again in October 2024 whether to publicly notify the proposed plan or pause work on the plan. In addition, the ORC moved that staff engage with government officials to discuss the national freshwater management policy review process and identify actions to address the issues associated with the changed plans should a new land and water regional plan not be notified.

On 22 October 2024, the ORC cancelled a scheduled vote on notifying its land and water management plan scheduled for 23 October after the New Zealand Government announced an amendment to the Resource Management Act Amendment Bill preventing regional councils and local territorial authorities from notifying freshwater plans before the Government replaces its national policy statement for freshwater management (NPSFM). While Forest & Bird advocacy group and Labour MP Brooking criticised the Government for undermining local government efforts to protect water quality, Federated Farmers Otago president Luke Kane said that the delay would help give the council an understanding of developments in the Otago region. Agriculture Minister McClay said that the Government amendment was intended to give clarity to local councils about the Government's freshwater management policies and minimise "duplication and inefficiencies." On 23 October, the ORC voted by margin of seven to five not to approve a motion expressing deep concern about legislation passed in the New Zealand Parliament on 22 October preventing the notification of the Land and Water Regional Plan. On 25 October, Cr Bryan Scott resigned from the Council in protest of the Government's move to block the notification of their land and water management plan.

=== Bus fares ===
In mid March 2024, the Otago Regional Council voted to continue funding free fares for children aged between five and 12 years old after the Government ends funding for subsidised bus fares on 30 April 2024. While the Government's Community Connect fare subsidy for people aged between 13 and 24 years old ends on 1 May 2024, Community Services cardholders and total mobility services users are still eligible for the half-price concession. Council Chair Gretchen Robertson justified the decision, citing the real demand for public transport and the need to make them accessible to the youngest users. The council also voted by a margin of 7–5 not to extend half-price bus fares for university students. Fares for university students reverted to NZ$2 for Bee card holders and NZ$3 for casual users.

=== 2025–2028 term ===
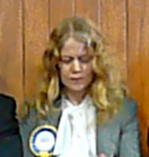
Hilary Calvert, Chair of the Otago Regional Council since October 2025.

Following the 2025 Otago Regional Council election which concluded on 11 October, former ACT Member of Parliament and Vision Otago leader Hilary Calvert was unanimously elected by her fellow councillors as the Council's chair in late October 2025. As chair of the ORC, Calvert implemented a new portfolio-based governance structure. In addition, the Council voted by a margin of eight to three votes to consult with local Māori mana whenua in the ORC's decision-making process.

On 27 November 2025, Calvert advanced a resolution that the ORC commit to a draft annual work plan and budget with a zero increase in rates. The resolution passed by a margin of 10-1 with Green Councillor Alan Somerville casting the sole opposing vote. The Sixth National Government's proposal on 25 November to replace the regional councils with "combined territories boards" attracted a mixture of response from the ORC. Calvert and fellow Vision Otago councillor Michael Laws welcomed the proposed abolition of the regional councils but contended that Port Otago belonged to the entire region rather than Dunedin. By contrast, Somerville opposed the proposed abolition of the regional councils, saying it would remove local decision-making and concentrate power in the "hands of individual ministers."

By mid-February 2026, Laws had reversed his support for the Government's "combined territories board" model and had joined Councillor Gretchen Robertson in advocating the creation of separate coastal and inland unitary councils to replace the two-tier system of regional and district councils. Chair Calvert and Councillor Andrew Noone supported engagement between the ORC and district councils to propose their own amalgamation plans. In late April 2026, Calvert met with New Zealand First Member of Parliament Mark Patterson, who confirmed that the Government had abandoned plans to replace the regional councils with combined territories boards before the end of the 54th New Zealand Parliamentary term after consulting with local government bodies.

On 5 May 2026, the Local Government Minister Simon Watts and the RMA Reform Minister Chris Bishop gave local councils a three-month timeframe to come up with amalgamation plans. These "Head start" amalgamation plans replaced the earlier proposed "combined territorial boards" and will be assessed by the newly-established Ministry for Cities, Environment, Regions and Transport (MCERT). Regional councils were excluded from the opportunity to put forward merger proposals within three months.

On 11 May 2026, Dunedin City Councillors Lee Vandervis, Andrew Simms and Russell Lund proposed that a Dunedin-Waitaki authority take over control and management of Port Otago as part of the Sixth National Government's local government reforms. Mayor of Dunedin Sophie Barker expressed cautious support for the idea. In response, ORC chairperson Calvert and councillor Michael Laws expressed disagreement, contending that Port Otago was a regional asset.
