= Paddy Walker =

New Zealand teacher and politician (1916–2015)

Edwina Diana Patricia Walker Eleitino, OBE
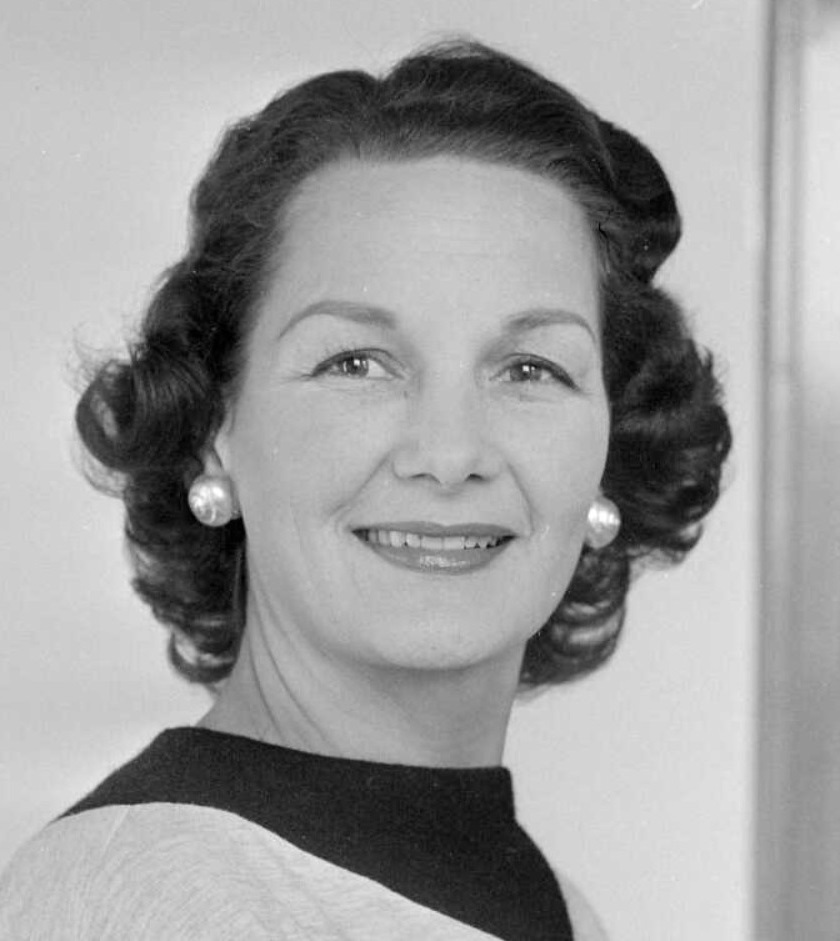
- Walker in 1957
- Born: Edwina Diana Patricia Halliday; 14 October 1916; Pago Pago, American Samoa
- Died: 8 July 2015 (aged 98); Auckland, New Zealand
- Occupations: Activist, political, fashion businesswoman, educator
- Children: 2, including Michal McKay

Eleitino Edwina Diana Patricia Walker (née Halliday; 14 October 1916 – 8 July 2015), known as Paddy Walker, was a New Zealand activist, politician, fashion businesswoman, and educator.

== Biography ==
Walker was born on 14 October 1916 in Pago Pago, American Samoa to a New Zealand father and Samoan mother from the chiefly. Seumanutafa family. At age 10 she began attending St Cuthbert's College in Auckland, carrying "only a suitcase and a ukulele". She would later teach music and eurhythmics at the school.

After introducing herself to James Hay, Walker became the first fashion coordinator at Christchurch-based department store Hay's. During her time at Hay's she changed the operations of fashion shows in New Zealand from "sedate affairs" to "dynamic choreographed fashion parades". Notably she organised a Lane Walker Rudkin fashion show for Queen Elizabeth II during her Royal tour of New Zealand. In 1952 she became fashion coordinator of the Auckland Milne & Choyce department store, where she worked closely with the stores in-house couturier Bruce Papas. Walker would also work closely as a freelance fashion show producer for many New Zealand fashion designers including Colin Cole and Emma Knuckey.

During the 1960s, Walker would produce a New Zealand Wool Board fashion show (attended by Queen Elizabeth II) and lead a New Zealand fabrics and textiles trade mission to India.

At the 1974 local elections Walker stood for the Auckland City Council on the Citizens & Ratepayers ticket and was elected (overseeing Parks and Reserves, and multicultural consultation). She was the first Auckland city councillor of Pacific descent and served two terms until 1980 when she did not stand for re-election. In 1974, she became the founding president Pacifica NZ, at Pacifica NZ she set up bursary funds for students from the Pacific Islands. She would hold roles at the National Council of Women of New Zealand, New Zealand Social Development Council, Māori and South Pacific Arts Council, and Pan Pacific and Southeast Asian Women's Association. She created "peace gardens" in several countries including the Cook Islands.

Following 1989 she collaborated with the Cook Islands Ministry of Education, establishing language learning, literacy, and arts programmes.

== Death ==
Walker died in Auckland on 8 July 2015.

== Personal life ==
She married travelling salesman Bill Walker. He would later develop tuberculosis after seeing in the Solomon Islands during World War II. He would spend five years in hospital, first in Auckland and then in Hanmer Springs. With Walker she had two children, including fashion journalist Michal McKay.

In 1989, she moved to Rarotonga. In 2014, she moved back to Auckland.

== Recognition ==
In the 1977 Queen's Silver Jubilee and Birthday Honours, Walker was appointed an Officer of the Order of the British Empire, for services to the community and women's affairs. In 2009, she was recognised as 1000 "peace women" globally who were nominated for that year's Nobel Peace Prize.

In 2014, Walker was honoured by the University of Auckland Faculty of Education with a distinguished fellow Award, for her services to Pacific education.

The Seumanutafa family, Chief of Apia provided her with the title Eleitino. A room at the Pioneer Women's Hall in Auckland is named in her honour.
