= Argall =

Argall is a surname, and may refer to:

- Audrey Argall (later Argall-Glasgow, 1898 – 1981), New Zealand freelance writer and magazine editor
- Dave Argall (born 1958), American politician
- Dennis Argall (1943–2023), Australian diplomat
- John Argall (fl. 1604), English cleric and logician
- Philip Argall (1855–1912), Australian cricket Test match umpire
- Richard Argall (fl. 1621), a poet, of whom little is known and whose existence is disputed
- Samuel Argall (c. 1572-1580 or 1626), English adventurer and naval officer
  - Argall: The True Story of Pocahontas and Captain John Smith

== See also ==
- Argal
