= Trilby Yates =

Trilby Yates was a pioneering New Zealand fashion label. Founded by sisters Trilby and Julia Yates, it operated from the 1920s to the 1950s. Along with Ninette Gowns and Bobby Angus, it is considered one of the founders of New Zealand fashion design. The careers of designers Nancy Hudson and Hall Ludlow began at the label, and it is credited with introducing New Zealanders to trousers as fashionable wear for women.

== Founding ==
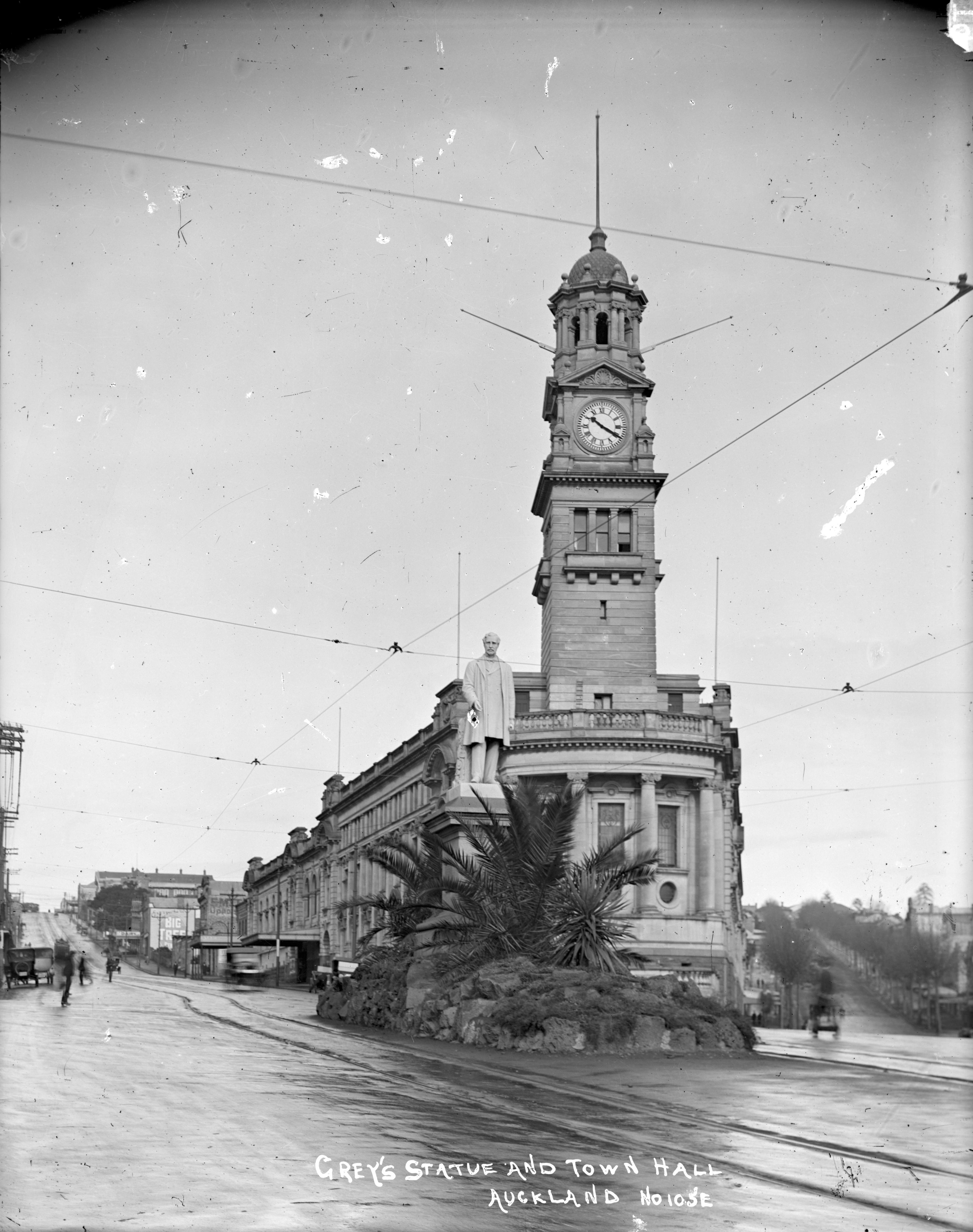
The Auckland Town Hall, c. 1910. The row of shops to the left would later become the first premises of Trilby Yates.

The label was founded by sisters Trilby and Julia Yates in the mid-1920s. Trilby, who was the older by nine years, had trained as a milliner at The Bon Marché, an emporium founded in Auckland in 1904. By 1923, the business was operating as a hat shop opposite the Auckland Town Hall at 374 Queen Street, under the name "Trilby Yates: the Ladies' Paradise". Trilby was a skilled milliner, described as being able to "take a tea towel and make a hat out of it". Julia, by contrast, could barely sew, but had business skills and connections with artistic friends such as the dancer Freda Stark and the filmmaker Robert Steele.

== High-fashion advancements ==
Around 1930, the shop moved to 179 Queen Street, Auckland, a more prestigious location with two streetfront windows. Julia's niece Ata Yates, who started in the Trilby Yates workroom in 1946, recalled the shop's exotic Oriental décor:

"In one window there would be fresh flowers and in the other a mannequin dressed in something striking. The rest of the clothes were out of sight in wardrobes. The store was dark red and shadowy — you'd have to be brave to go in if you were an ordinary person."

In 1933 Trilby died young, and her daughter Digsy was cared for and later adopted by Julia. In the early 1930s, Julia changed the focus of the shop to high fashion and bespoke womenswear. She hired 22-year-old designer Nancy Hudson, a graduate of the Elam School of Fine Arts who was designing made-to-order garments for the dressmaker Alice Thomas. Julia travelled overseas regularly in the 1930s to Paris and New York, bringing back expensive fabrics and ideas such as branded shopping bags to replace boxes. On one trip she was fascinated to see women wearing trousers "à la Dietrich"; her early 1930s display of women's trousers she later created in the Auckland salon sparked an uproar and a "Current Controversies" column in the New Zealand Woman's Weekly. Julia claimed to be the first woman in New Zealand to wear trousers, which by 1940 she did almost exclusively. She recalled being spat upon on Queen Street for wearing trousers, saying it was one of the most frightening experiences of her life.

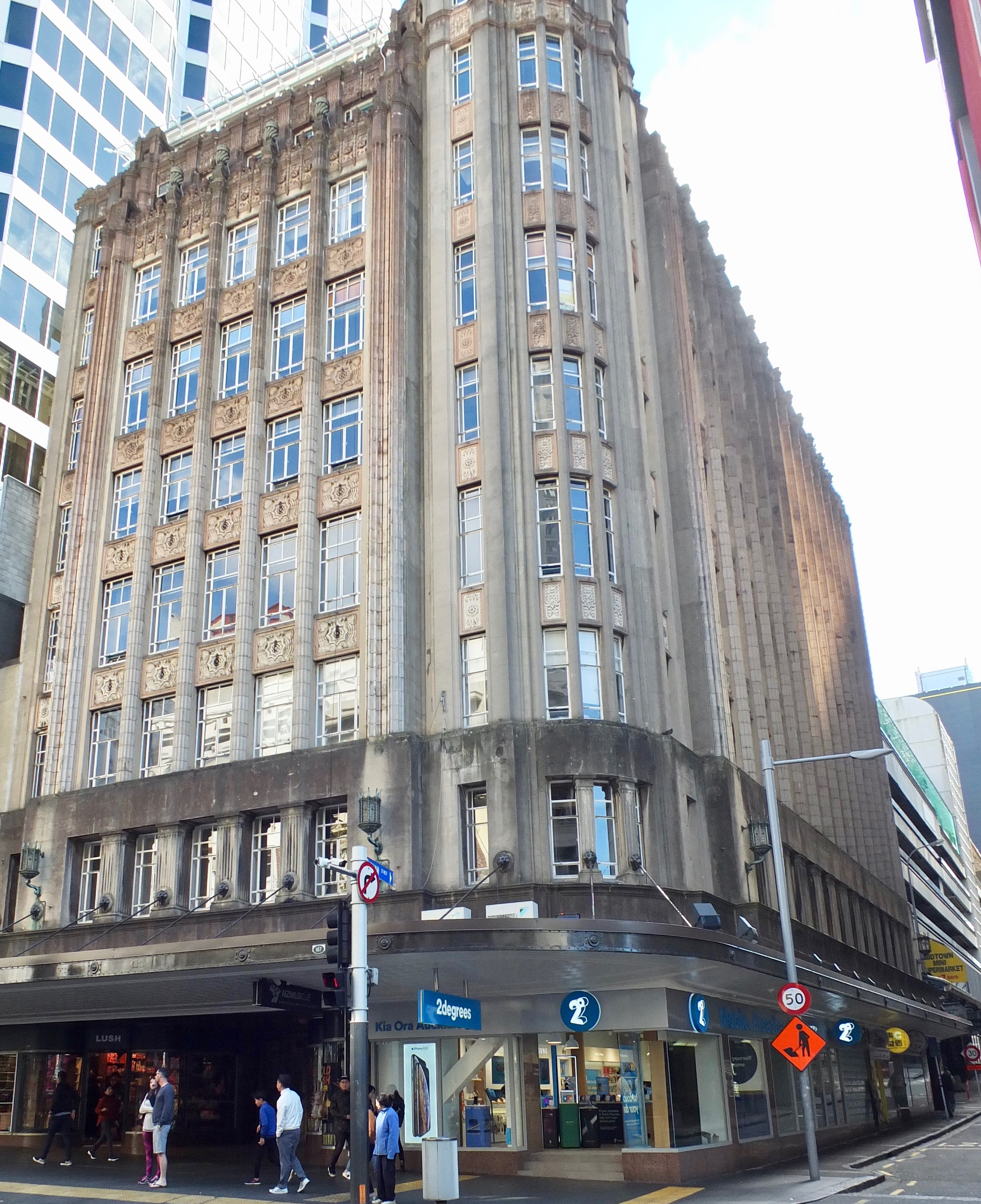
179 Queen Street, which from around 1930 to the early 1950s was the storefront of the company. The workroom at 26 Durham Street West, the street to the right, has not survived.

The designs of Nancy Hudson made the label very successful in the 1940s, aided by US servicemen stationed in New Zealand purchasing clothes for their girlfriends. As Julia put it, "as soon as we saw a Yankee uniform walking through the door, we were sure of a sale." The store was redecorated in pink and cream with sliding-mirror cabinets; garments were made in a nearby workroom, on the second floor of 26 Durham St West, which was connected to the shop floor by an intercom. Julia held a winter and spring 'opening' each year. These were major events, as former Trilby Yates designer Kate Lambourne recalled:

"I was pushed aside and all but stepped on. Women in full bling fighting over a garment – and in one case a dress was torn apart. Julia would watch from her office chuckling away at the behaviour downstairs."

== Post-war years ==
Trilby Yates was the starting place for many designers, such as Hall Ludlow, who joined in 1945. Julia claimed Ludlow was "the first man in the country to make dresses". Nancy Hudson left Trilby Yates in the late 1940s to work in Australia, and was replaced by June Gould (née Todd), and then Maxine Sigglecoe.

By the 1950s, Digsy Yates was a cutter and designer; when she left to get married, Julia retired. The business closed in the early 1950s, and staff found work at Emma Knuckey Gowns or Violet Gowns. Ata Yates started a dressmaking business in Te Awamutu. Digsy kept working as a dressmaker into the 1970s with her daughter, who was also named Trilby. Julia travelled the world extensively, and died in her 90s.
