= Laufiso =

Laufiso is a surname. It may refer to:

- Marie Laufiso, New Zealand local politician
- Pip Laufiso, New Zealand arts advisor
- Eti Laufiso, a Sāmoan educationalist and language-teaching specialist
