= Michal McKay =

New Zealand journalist (1942–2024)

Michal Louise McKay (née: Walker; 23 August 1942 – 16 March 2024), was a New Zealand journalist and fashion editor.

== Early life ==
McKay was born on 23 August 1942 in Wellington, New Zealand. McKay was the daughter of Bill and Paddy Walker. She grew up in Christchurch as her father recovered from tuberculosis at the Hanmer Sanitorium.

== Career ==
As a child, McKay modelled for the Milne & Choyce department store and was photographed alongside her mother for L'Officiel. Bernard Leser (founder of Vogue Australia and later president of Condé Nast) served as a "mentor and guide" to McKay from a young age.

As a teenager she joined The New Zealand Herald as a cadet reporter and worked as a model.

In 1964, she replaced Marie Stuttard as fashion and beauty editor of Vogue New Zealand. However, before she took over the role she completed a three-month internship at British Vogue, McKay was sent there by New Zealand Vogue editor-in-chief Sheila Scotter to be "Voguerised". In 1967, she moved to London and was appointed fashion and beauty editor at the British edition of Good Housekeeping. She often travelled to the London fashion shows with Anna Wintour and Jennifer Hocking.

In 1973 she became associate editor at Vogue Australia. In the late 1970s, she served as marketing and development director of Country Road. McKay later became design director for Norma Tullo and Carla Zampatti. McKay also worked in brand development and marketing for Beymen and Sportsgirl. She served as fashion and beauty editor for The Australian Women's Weekly. McKay returned to London join Good Housekeeping as deputy editor.

In 1985, McKay was appointed editor of the New Zealand Woman's Weekly. Under her leadership the magazine was given an "educational uplift" and moved upmarket, however, circulation dropped and she resigned from the magazine in 1987. She returned to London and joined Estée Lauder.

McKay joined Vogue Singapore in 1996 as editor-in-chief. The magazine closed from its January 1997 issue due to the Asian Financial Crisis.

In 2005, McKay returned to New Zealand, following the invitation of Fairfax Media to edit New Zealand House & Garden. McKay was appointed editorial director of New Zealand House & Garden and Cuisine. In 2009, McKay founded Maiki, a creative communications consultancy, through the firm she would consult the Royal New Zealand Ballet. In 2013, she became a columnist at Viva, a New Zealand Herald fashion supplement.

McKay moved to Havelock North in 2015 and became a committee member for World Child Cancer Charity Trust and the Hawkes Bay Decorative and Fine Arts Society. From 2016 until her death, McKay was an editor and contributor at Bay Buzz. McKay was a trustee of the New Zealand Fashion Museum.

== Personal life ==
In 1967, she was engaged to Ross McKay (son of Don McKay). They married in 1968 and divorced in 1973.

== Death ==
McKay died on 16 March 2024 at home.

== Bibliography ==
- Wanaka (Random House New Zealand, 2011)

Media offices
Preceded by Jean Wishart	Editor of New Zealand Woman's Weekly; 1985–1987	Succeeded by Jenny Lynch
Preceded by Nancy Pilcher	Editor of Vogue Singapore; 1996–1997	Succeeded by Norman Tan
