= Caren Rangi =

Cook Islands accountant, public servant, and company director

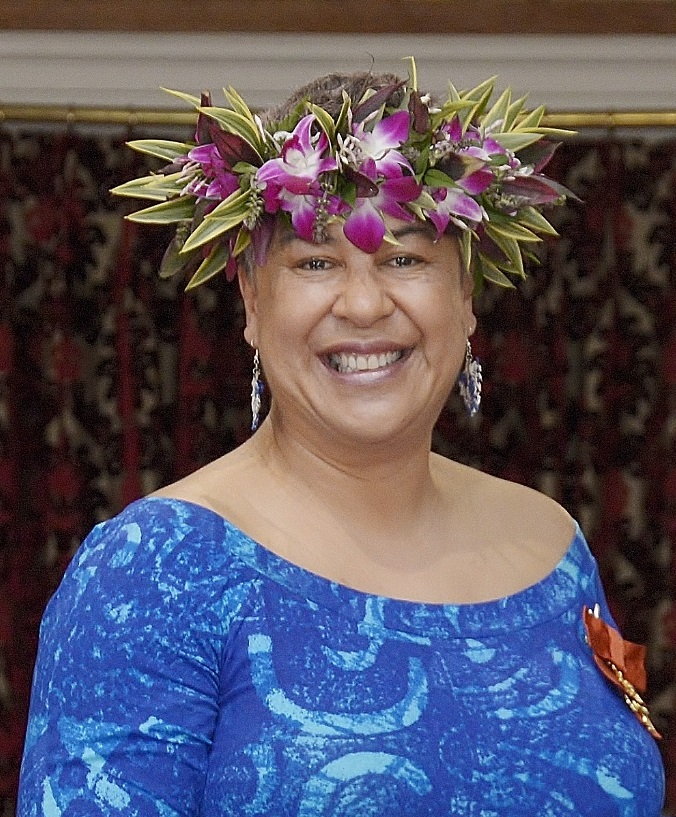
Caren Rangi in 2018

Caren Jane Rangi ONZM (born ~1967) is a Cook Islands governance practitioner, chartered accountant, former public servant, and company director. She is the first Pacific woman to serve as chair of the Arts Council of New Zealand Toi Aotearoa.

Of Manihiki and Rarotongan descent, Rangi was born in Christchurch, New Zealand. She grew up in Napier suburb of Tamatea, and was educated at Tamatea School, Tamatea Intermediate, and Tamatea High School. She studied for a Bachelor of Business Studies at Massey University before working for the Office of the Controller and Auditor-General. In 2008 she became a consultant, and subsequently worked in a range of governance roles.

Rangi has served on the boards of Te Papa, NZ On Air, and Radio New Zealand. In 2015 she was appointed as a director of the Cook Islands Investment Corporation. From 2015 to 2017 she was National President of PACIFICA, the Pacific women's council. In April 2021 she was appointed as chair the board of the Arts Council of New Zealand Toi Aotearoa.

Rangi is currently the Pro-Chancellor of Massey University, Chair of not for profit organisation Pacific Homecare, , a director of New Zealand Rugby, and the Deputy Chair of Pacific Co-operation Broadcasting Ltd.

In 2022, Rangi officially opened Bergman Gallery in Auckland, New Zealand, the sister gallery of the original gallery in Rarotonga, Cook Islands. There was also a delegation from the Cook Islands attended the official opening with the Minister of Cultural Development, George Maggie Angene, Cultural Development Secretary, Anthony Turua and Cook Islands Consular Officer, Keu Mataroa.

== Honours ==
In the 2018 Queen's Birthday Honours, Rangi was appointed an Officer of the New Zealand Order of Merit, for services to the Pacific community and governance.
