= Emma Kesha =

Pacific weaver in Dunedin, New Zealand

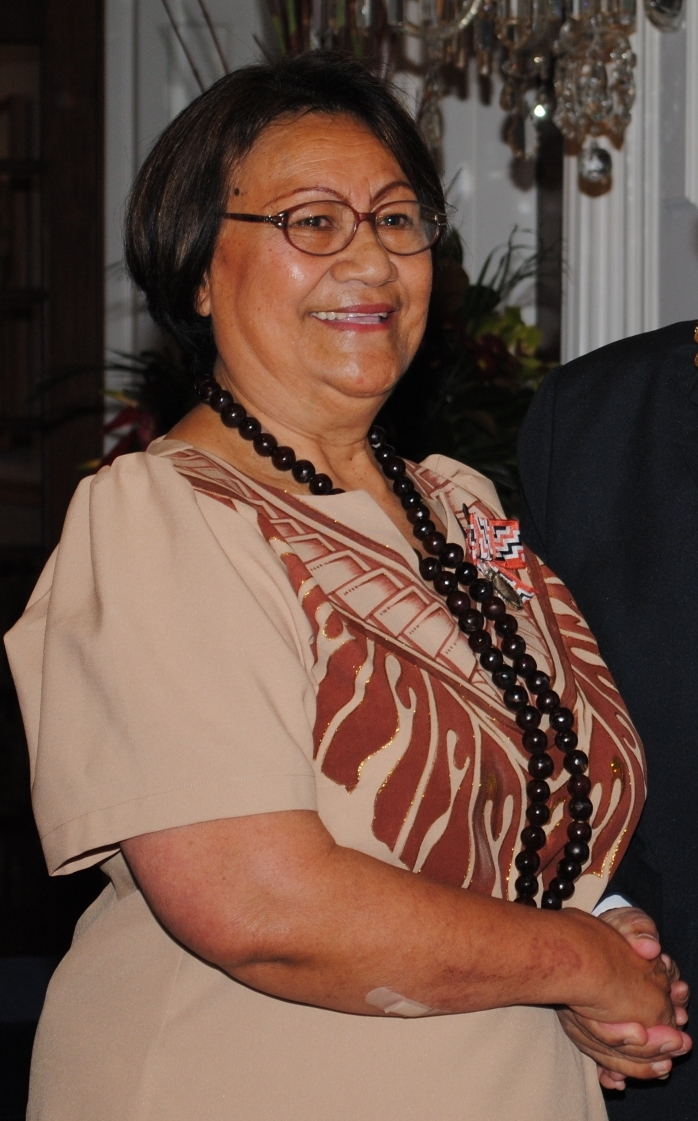
Emma Kesha, following her investiture in August 2011

Misa Emma Kesha QSM (born 1940 or 1941) is a Samoan master weaver based in Dunedin, New Zealand, who has received awards for her contribution to the arts, Pacific communities and weaving in New Zealand.

== Early life ==
She grew up in grew up in the village of Fusi, Saluafata, Anomaa, Upolu. Her mother is Apoua Peai Fuatavai from Salelesi, and her father, Enosa Fuatavai, is from Fusi, Saluafata. She started weaving as a child influenced by her mother and grandmother. Kesha came to New Zealand in 1958 and initially lived in Auckland in Ponsonby.

She says of weaving in Samoa:

"It's an everyday activity in the village where I grew up. In Samoa, we weave mats for the floor, and baskets to carry food from the plantation, and bags to carry your Bible to church, and personal belongings, and fans to cool ourselves in the hot Pacific climate." Emma Kesha (2010)

== Career ==
Kesha in her working life ran a leather manufacturing business; she is retired now.

Kesha was invested in organisations to further Pacific culture and weaving. She was a member of the PACIFICA organisation (formally the Pacific Women's Council) and attended the eighth annual conference in Wellington in 1983. In 1983 she set up the Multicultural Weavers Association in Dunedin. Te Roopu Raranga Whatu o Aotearoa, a national weaving group was also set up in 1983, and Kesha was a committee member in 1993 along with Emily Schuster (convener), Cath Brown, Waana Davis, Toi Maihi, Diggeress Te Kanawa, Te Auē Davis, Rānui Ngārimu, Mata Smith (Niue) and Tepaeru Tereora (Cook Islands).

Kesha has tutored and exhibited in New Zealand, Tonga, Samoa, Nouméa, New Caledonia and Australia. A regular workshop Kesha ran was the Iva-Pacific Arts Workshops at the Canterbury Museum. In 2009 it was the ninth time for her to do this workshop as part of the Pacific Arts Festival of Christchurch organised by Pacific Underground.

In 2002 Kesha was the University of Canterbury Macmillan Brown Centre for Pacific Studies Artist in Residence and created an installation called Siva Siva Maia: Come Dance with me.

Kesha was one of 100 artists to represent New Zealand at the 11th Festival of Pacific Arts in Solomon Islands in July 2012.

== Honours and awards ==
Kesha was awarded the chieftain title Misa in recognition of service to her family and community in Samoa in 1998. She was the first woman in her family to receive this title.

At the 2010 Creative New Zealand Arts Pasifika Awards, Kesha won the supreme award. Kesha was awarded the Queen's Service Medal (QSM) in the 2011 Queen's Birthday Honours, for services to the Pacific community.

== Personal life ==
Kesha married Harry (Hira) Kesha in 1961.
