= Bruce Papas =

New Zealand fashion designer (1931–2020)

- Born: Stephanos Bruce Papas; Auckland, New Zealand
- Education: Ponsonby Primary School
- Occupation: Fashion designer
- Parent: Steven Papas (Staevros Papadopoulos)
- Relatives: Jessie (sister)

Bruce Papas (31 March 1931 - March 2020) was a New Zealand fashion designer.

== Education and early life ==
Papas' mother's family emigrated from Scotland to Hokianga, and his father came from Greece. His parents met when his father traveled to Northland to work on the gum fields. Papas' parents moved to Auckland after they married. Papas trained as a cabinet maker at Seddon Memorial Technical College in Auckland when the fashion designer Flora MacKenzie came across an example of his glass work. She offered the then 15-year-old a job in her fashion boutique, Ninette Gowns. In 1950, Papas settled at Titirangi in West Auckland.

== Career ==
During his five-year apprenticeship, Papas learnt about fabrics, design, drafting, pattern making, hand cording and embroidery. He left Ninette Gowns to start his own business named Staevros Gowns after his father who had recently passed away. He worked from a room in his mother's house that had fitting rooms on one side and a work space on the other. Bruce continued to specialise in haute couture for a small number of clients, some of whom followed him from Ninette Gowns. His wedding and bridesmaids gowns, in particular, received much acclaim. However, he was soon called up for compulsory training with the RAF.

On his return, Papas was headhunted by the department store Milne & Choyce. They were looking for a full-time designer to create three ranges a year – approximately 500 styles – and manage a workroom of 50 staff. Papas was the head designer for Milne & Choyce, overseeing a staff of 50. A gown produced by Papas was worn by the Queen of Tonga, Sālote Tupou III, at the Coronation of Elizabeth II.

Later in life, he established a salon on Queen Street, working until he retired in the early 1980s.

== Awards and recognition ==
In 1961, Papas won the inaugural Golden Shears Awards with his Golden Peacock gown. A large collection of his garments and design sketches are held at the Auckland War Memorial Museum.

== Exhibitions ==
In 2018, the New Zealand Fashion Museum celebrated Papas' legacy with an exhibition "A Certain Style: Bruce Papas.
