= Susana Lemisio =

Tokelauan New Zealand community organiser and educator (born 1945)

Susana Lemisio MNZM
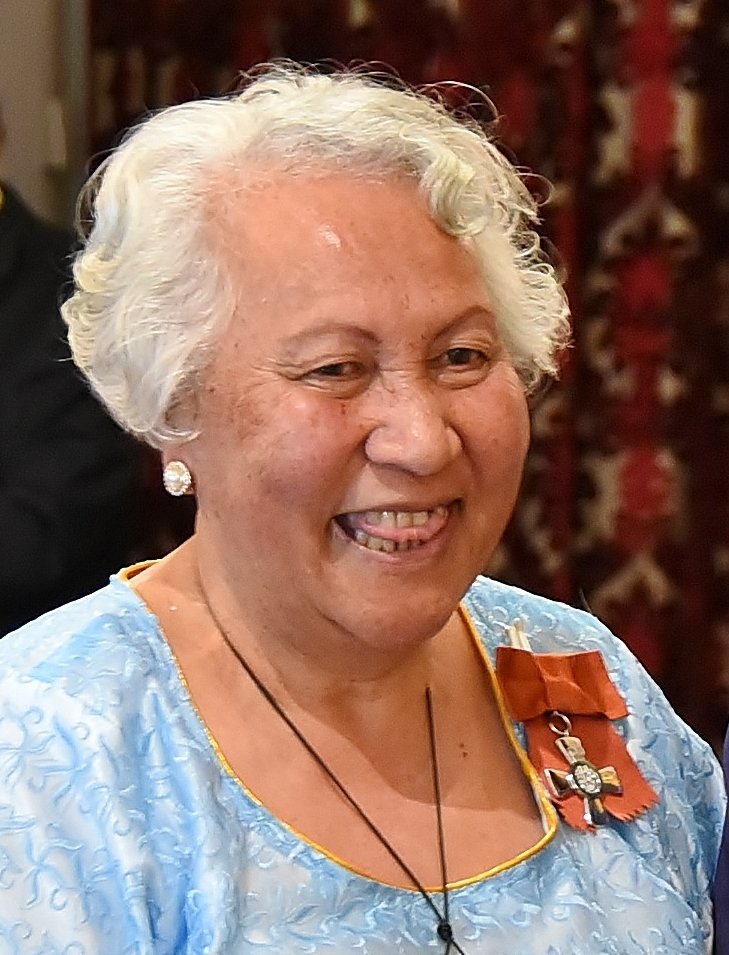
- Lemisio in 2016
- Born: Huhana Susana Tetane Perez; 16 November 1945 (age 81); Nukunonu, Tokelau
- Spouse: Teofilo Kainaki Lemisio
- Awards: New Zealand 1990 Commemoration Medal

Susana Tetane Lemisio MNZM (née Perez; born 16 November 1945) is a community organiser and educator from Tokelau who lives in New Zealand.

== Background ==
Born Huhana Susana Tetane Perez, 16 November 1945, on the Tokelau atoll of Nukunonu, she is the youngest child of Ateliano and Malia Sei Perez. In 1964, Lemisio was part of a group from the Tokelau Islands who came to live in New Zealand as part of the 'Government Resettlement Scheme of Tokelau to New Zealand' and by 1975 she had settled in Petone, Lower Hutt. She married Teofilo Lemisio at Sacred Heart Church in Petone, and she currently lives in Lower Hutt.

== Career ==
Lemisio became involved in education in the 1970s, first as a parent helper at the Petone Polynesian Pre-School. Through this early work she began to organise with several other women at the school to develop and formalise the teaching of the Tokelauan language and culture. In 1987 she had gained support from teachers and community leaders to establish the first Tokelau Language Nest for Tokelauan children in Petone. At that time there had been no formal Pacific education plan and Lemisio's efforts complemented those being done by other Pasifika leaders including the Māori community (with the establishment of Kura Kaupapa Māori) and Samoan community (with the creation of the Samoan language nest, Ā'oga 'Āmata).

Lemisio encouraged other mothers to engage with the language nest, leading to an increase in the number of Tokelauan women qualifying as Early Childhood Education teachers. Since the creation of the Petone Tokelauan language nests, additional language nests have been created in Auckland, Rotorua, Taupo, Porirua, Naenae, Taita, Stokes Valley, Upper Hutt, and Dunedin.

In 1988, she supported the founding of the Ofaga o te Gagana Tokelau Ahohi i Aotearoa-New Zealand (Tokelau Early Childhood Association Aotearoa-New Zealand), a national organization supporting early learning centers across New Zealand. She continues to be a member and advisor to current president Rev. Nathan Pedro.

Lemisio was instrumental in the 2002 Te Motumotu initiative, designed to promote the Tokelau language and early learning through the Ofaga o te Gagana Tokelau Association. This work led to the first Tokelau language guidelines by the New Zealand Ministry of Education, Gagana Tokelau: The Tokelau Language Guidelines, published in 2009.

Lemisio was a founding member of the Tokelau Hutt Valley Sports and Culture Association, Te Umiumiga A Tokelau Hutt Valley Inc (Tokelau community umbrella organisation), and co-founded a Fatupaepae branch of PACIFICA for Tokelau women.

== Honours and awards ==
In 1990, Lemisio was awarded the New Zealand 1990 Commemoration Medal. In the 2016 Queen's Birthday Honours, she was appointed a Member of the New Zealand Order of Merit in recognition of services to the Tokelau community and early childhood education.
