= DEKA (New Zealand) =

Defunct New Zealand general merchandise store chain

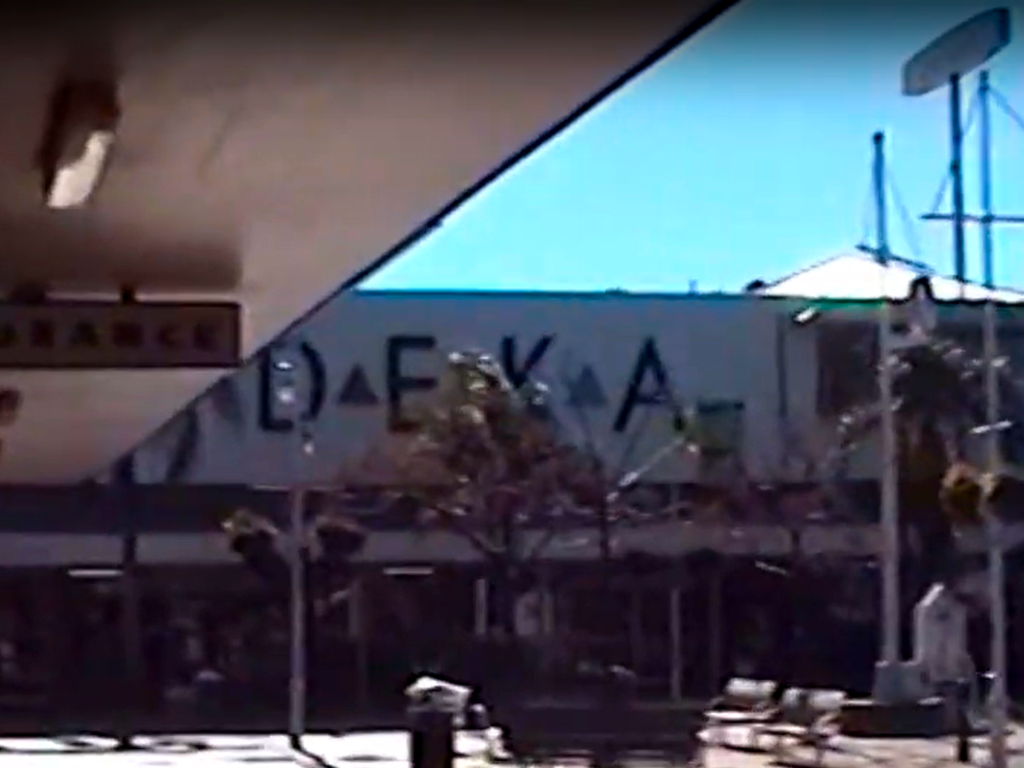
- DEKA store in Tauranga in 2001
- Industry: Retail
- Founded: 1988
- Defunct: 2001
- Fate: Rebranded to Farmers
- Successor: Farmers
- Area served: New Zealand
- Owner: Farmers Trading Company
- Website: Archived official website at the Wayback Machine (archived 2001-05-18)

DEKA was a nationwide chain of general merchandise stores in New Zealand. It was launched in 1988 by L.D. Nathan, which split its supermarket and general merchandise divisions. In 1992 ownership of DEKA shifted to the Farmers Trading Company, which had until then been a competitor. As a result of unsustainable financial losses, all DEKA stores were either closed or converted to Farmers stores in 2001.

== Trading history ==
In 1985 L.D. Nathan split their business into two separate divisions; supermarkets and general merchandise after acquiring the McKenzies general merchandise stores. In 1988 L.D Nathan rebranded their General Merchandise business (MaxiMart, Big City, Mark II) to DEKA, which launched with 90 stores (branded as either DEKA or DEKA-Maximart) The launch was supported with a large advertising campaign of print and TV advertising with the "I Feel Good" slogan, using the James Brown I Got You song. DEKA used the "I Feel Good" slogan until 1996.

DEKA joined with Farmers Trading Company in 1992 to create Farmers Deka Limited. 1996 saw the launch of DEKA's new slogan "You Know Where" which was later changed to "Better value, every day". By 2000 DEKA store numbers had reduced to 61 stores.

== Closure ==
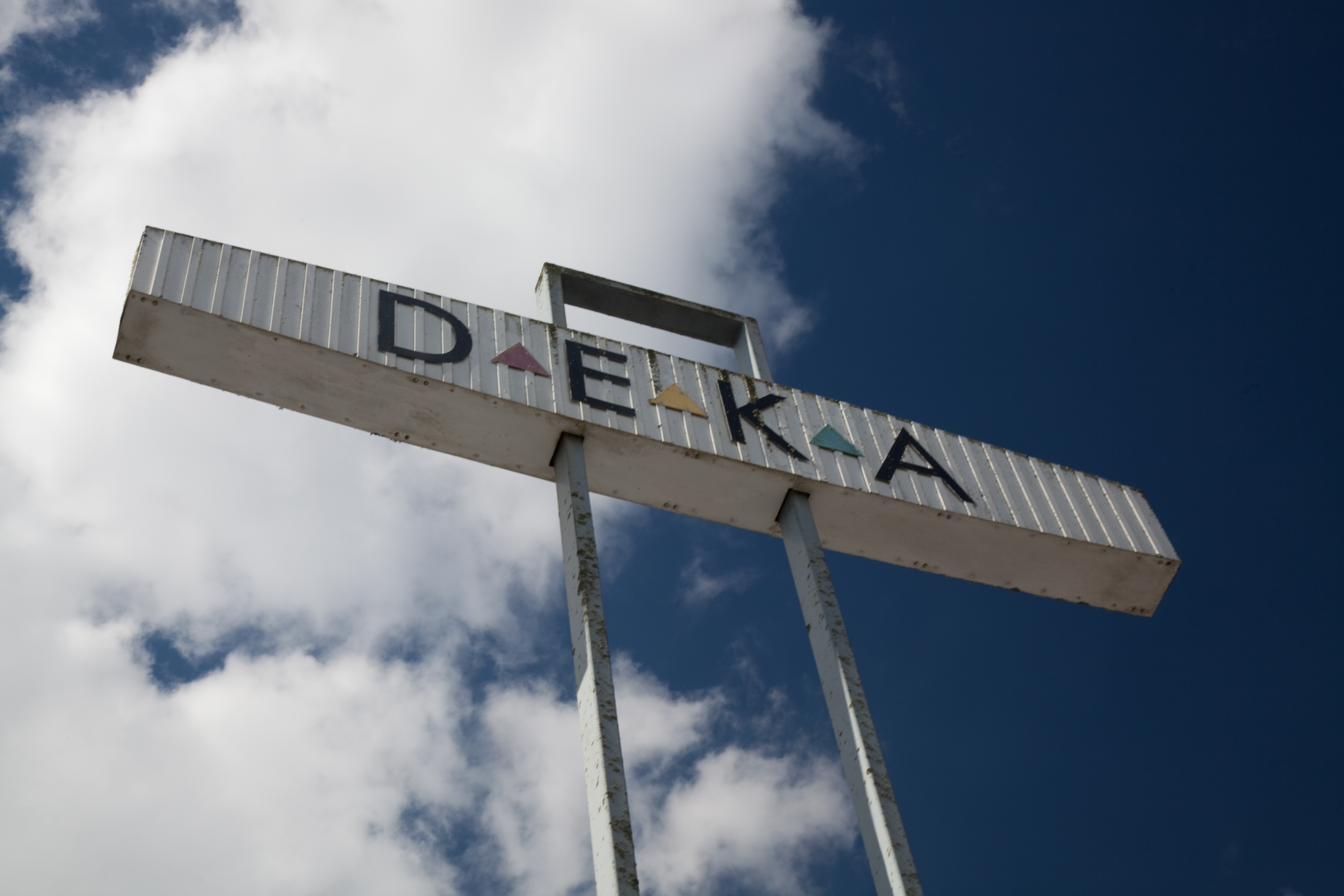
A DEKA sign still stands in Huntly.

On 30 July 2001, the DEKA brand ceased to operate in New Zealand. Its demise was due to fierce competition from The Warehouse and continual trading losses. Seventeen stores were converted to Farmers stores and the remaining 43 were closed.

The closure was announced in March 2001 by Farmers Deka Limited and its Australian parent company Foodland Associated Limited (FAL). They announced half-year losses of NZ$3.3m, which were accelerating, and redundancies for 468 full-time and 947 part-time employees. These job losses were partially offset by "almost 400" new roles within Farmers stores (including the 17 rebranded DEKAs).

In 2013, local residents of Huntly requested that a DEKA sign that had stood alone for more than a decade since the store's closure stay as a national icon.

== See also ==
- Woolworths (New Zealand)
