= Pacifica Inc. =

New Zealand organisation

The Pacifica Inc logo

Pacifica Inc., sometimes styled P.A.C.I.F.I.C.A. or PACIFICA is a non-government organisation in Aotearoa New Zealand established in 1977 following a Pacific women's conference held in Auckland in 1976. It consists mainly of Pasifika women, although all women of any background, faith and ethnicity are eligible to join. The organisation seeks to provide opportunities for Pacific women to contribute effectively to the cultural, social, economic and political development of Aotearoa.

In 2023, the organisation published A Wellbeing Report: Voices from Pacific Women and Girls in Aotearoa, New Zealand as part of an aim to present a record of Pacific women and girls’ voices.

== Notable members ==
- Susana Lemisio, co-founded a Fatupaepae branch of Pacifica for Tokelau women
- Emma Kesha
- Caren Rangi, president 2015 to 2017
- Paddy Walker, founding president in 1976
- Eti Laufiso, founding member
- Anahila Kanongata'a, national executive member
- Fanaura Kingstone, founding member in 1976
- Tepaeru Tereora, founding member in 1976
- Johnny Frisbie, founding member
- Peggy Fairbairn-Dunlop, president 2013
- Elizabeth Kerekere Young Pacifica member
