= Haywrights =

Defunct New Zealand department store chain

Haywrights Ltd.
- Trade name: Haywrights
- Industry: Retail
- Genre: Department stores
- Predecessor: Hays; Wright-Stephenson
- Founded: 13 December 1929; 96 years ago (as Hay's) 1968 (as Hay's-Wright Stephenson) 1980 (as Farmers-Haywrights)
- Founder: James Hay
- Defunct: 1982
- Fate: Merged with Farmers Co-op then sold to FTC.
- Successor: Farmers Trading Company
- Headquarters: Christchurch, New Zealand,
- Area served: New Zealand

Haywrights was a New Zealand department store chain that was founded in 1929 and eventually grew to be one of the largest department store chains in New Zealand.

== History ==
The store opened on 13 December 1929 as Hay's. It was founded by businessman and philanthropist James Hay.

In 1968, the chain merged with Wright Stephenson (retail division) to form Hay's-Wright Stephenson, with the merger the chain expanded into the North Island. On 1 August 1970 Hay's-Wright Stephenson became Haywrights after confusion among customers about the name.

In January 1976 Haywrights purchased Milne & Choyce a department store chain based in Auckland, in an effort to expand further into the North Island. A total of 30–40 employees were laid off at the Mount Roskill Warehouse and at the Downtown Shopping Centre store Milne & Choyce stores.

The company was taken over by the Farmers Co-operative Association in 1980 and integrated into a chain of department stores with all stores from Farmers and Haywrights being rebranded to Farmers & Haywrights (commonly written as Farmers-Haywrights or Farmers Haywrights or Farmers/Haywrights). In 1982 Bunting & Co. acquired the company and sold 13 stores of Farmers & Haywrights stores to Farmers Trading Company (FTC) and a distribution centre in Christchurch for $12 million along with this the other stores were closed. With this sale Farmers & Haywrights stores became part of FTC.

== Stores ==
Date opened is when the store became a Hay's, Haywrights or Farmers & Haywrights, if known opening date as its previous incarnation will be stated.

Location	About	Opening	Closing
South Island Locations
Gloucester Street, Christchurch	Flagship location of the brand, opened in 1929 as Hay's and operated until 1982 when it was rebranded as a Farmers, the building was torn down in 1997 and Farmers operated on the site until the 2011 Christchurch earthquake, the Te Pae: Christchurch Convention Centre now sits on the site. The store was also home to the well known Hay's Rooftop which was a children's playground on the roof of the store it existed from the opening until its conversion into a Farmers store. The store faced onto Armagh Street/Victoria Square, Colombo Street & Gloucester Street. In 1970 the Hay's signage was removed from the Victoria Square side and replaced with Haywrights signage.	1929	1982
Sydenham, Christchurch	On 22 March 1955, Hay's opened its Sydenham store (also known as the South Christchurch store), the store was expanded in 1975 and eventually turned into a Farmers store (now closed). Around the store the South Mall was built which is now known as The Colombo.	1955	
Church Corner, Christchurch	Opening in 1960 the store was converted to Farmers in 1982 when FTC purchased the company and later it was converted into a Dollar Wise supermarket and then demolished in the late 1980s a Countdown supermarket is now on the site.	1960	1982
Timaru	In 1961 Hay's purchased Timaru department store T. and J. Thomson (Est. 1883) they rebranded the store into Hay's and in 1982 it was converted to Farmers and the Farmers still operates currently. Before the permanent store a limited time furniture showroom was opened in 1938 above the State Theatre on Stafford Street.	1961	1982
Oamaru	The Oamaru store was originally the John Bulleid department store and was bought and rebranded to Hays in 1961, the store is currently a Farmers.	1961	1982
Northlands, Christchurch	Opened as a Hay's branch on 18 October 1967, prior to the Northlands mall opening on 1 November 1967, the store was converted to Farmers in 1982 and still currently operates as a Farmers.	1967	1982
Riccarton Mall, Christchurch	Originally a Farmers co-op which opened with the mall in 1965. In 1980 the store was rebranded from Farmers to Farmers-Haywrights and closed in 1982. The space was converted into fifteen more stores a mezzaine level and renovation of the office spaces in the mall.	1980	1982
Rangiora	The store was originally a Farmers Co-op and in 1982 was bought by Rangiora Farmers Ltd. and continued to trade as Farmers, the main shareholder of the Rangiora Farmers company were A. Still manager of the Cashel Street store and T. Freer manager of the Rangiora store. The store is currently still a Farmers but the building was replaced after it received earthquake damage.	1980	1982
Ashburton	Originally a Hay's. The Farmers Co-op store was merged into the store in 1980		
Baclutha			1976
Dunedin	The store was large with entrances on George Street and Great King Street, located between Moray Place and St Andrew Street. The building was originally constructed for the firm of A.T. Inglis and was later the premises of Brown Ewing Ltd before becoming the Dunedin Hay's branch. As of 2023 the building is a Farmers and the only Farmers store in Dunedin.		1982
Blenheim	The store eventually became part of the Centre Point mall at Market Square/Market Place and another smaller Hardware store also existed in Blenheim. A sub-branch of the store existed in Picton for the "holidaymaker". The store was located at 31 Market Street.		
Nelson			
Motueka	The store was sold in 1982 to Whitwell Holdings which owned the building that the store was located in. Located at 201 High Street and was the last operating store operating till at least 1989.		
Greymouth	The first branch store opened in 1938. The store was closed in 1982 and was taken over by T. A. Dellaca.	1938	1982
Cashel Street, Christchurch	Converted to Christchurch Home Centre.	1980	1982
Queen Street, Blenheim			
Richmond			
Rakaia			
Methven			
North Island Locations
Downtown Shopping Centre, Auckland	Opened as a Milnes in February 1975 the store was rebranded to Haywrights in January 1976 after Haywrights purchase of the Milne & Choyce company, the store continued on as a Haywrights store until October 1979. The Downtown Shopping Centre closed in 2016 and on the site currently is the Commercial Bay development.	1976	1979
Glenfield Mall, Auckland	The store opened at the same time as the mall in 1971, It opened as a Haywrights and was later sold to Farmers Trading Company in 1978. Farmers still currently operates a store at the mall.	1971	1978
Henderson			
LynnMall, Auckland	Opened as a Milne & Choyce in 1963 it was sold to Rendells Ltd. in 1978.	1963	1978
Māngere			1978
Manukau City Mall, Auckland			
Panmure, Auckland	The store was sold to Rendells Ltd. in 1978 & as of 2022 is a Postie store		
St. Lukes, Auckland			
Takapuna, Auckland	The store closed in 1978		
Rotorua	The store opened on 29 February 1969, as John Courts then rebranded to Cornishs in 1974 and then Haywrights in September 1975. In 1979 was sold and converted into a D.I.C opening on 1 August 1979. The store was on the corner of Tutanekei & Eruera St.		
Napier	The store was sold to D.I.C in 1979.		
Dannevirke	The store was sold to D.I.C in 1979.		
Taihape			
Hamilton			
Tūrangi			
Coastlands, Paraparaumu	The store was sold to James Smith in 1979.		
Lambton Quay, Wellington	Appliance store sold to James Smith in 1979.		
Lower Hutt			
Masterton			
Martinborough			1973
Pahiatua			1974

== Gallery ==
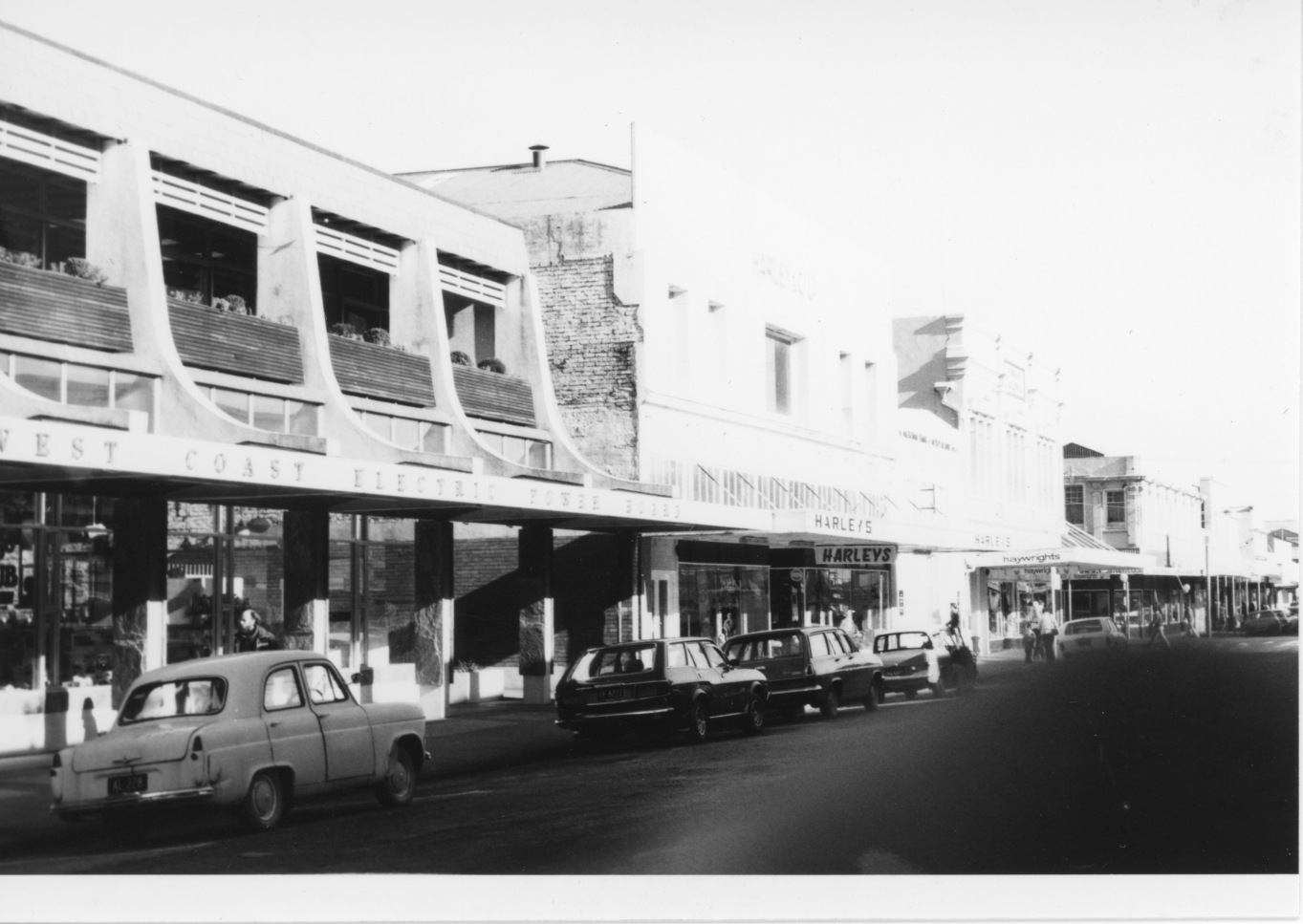
Haywrights, Greymouth (Seen in the background)

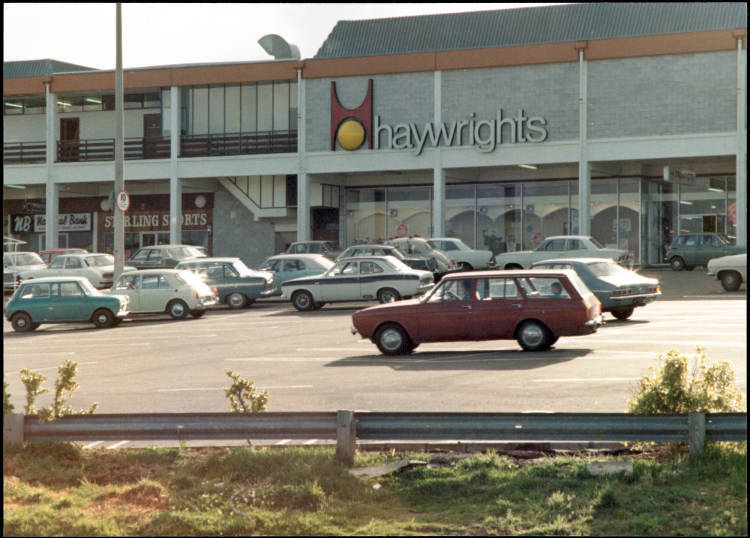
Haywrights Glenfield Mall

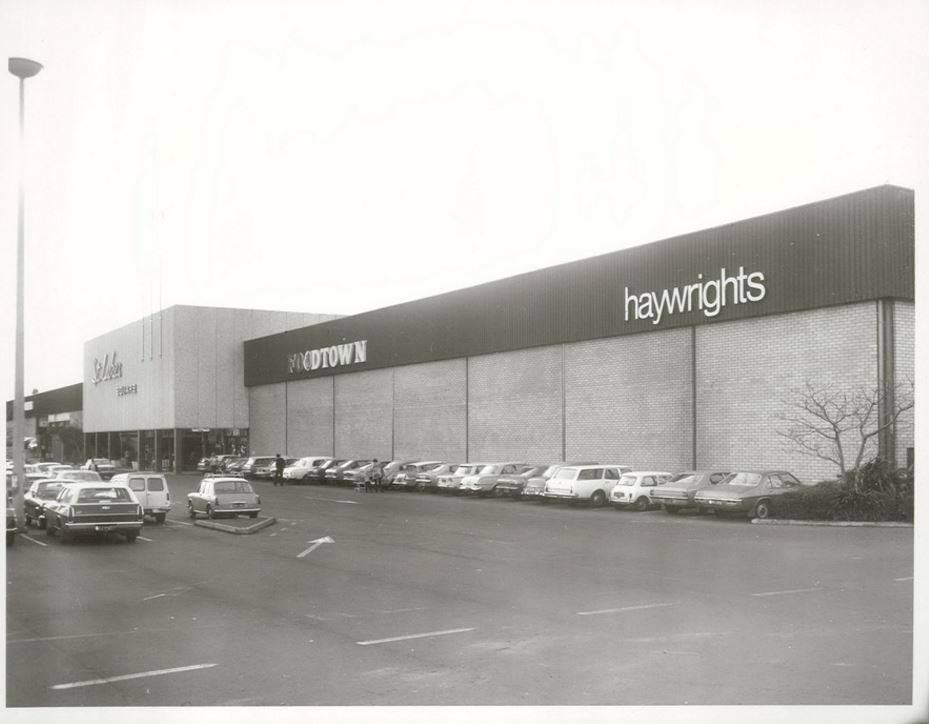
Outside St. Lukes, late 1970s
