= Flora MacKenzie =

New Zealand fashion designer

Flora MacKenzie (1902–1982) was a New Zealand dress designer and brothel owner, based in Auckland for most of her life.

== Early life ==
Born in 1902, Mackenzie was the daughter of Sir Hugh Ross MacKenzie, a farmer and horse stud owner in Māngere, Auckland. After finishing secondary school, she began to train as a nurse, but did not accept discipline from the matrons who supervised trainee nursing activities. However, she discovered that she did have a flair for dressmaking, and opened Ninette Gowns in Vulcan Lane, Auckland. Her shop became highly successful, attracting a prosperous clientele from Auckland's more affluent suburbs.

== Brothel ownership ==
Mackenzie embraced the sexual freedom of the 1920s, and soon found that there were other young women that wanted a private venue within which to pursue their relationships. In time, this branched out to female sex workers as well. Her father realised that Mackenzie would probably never marry, and bought her a series of properties in Ring Terrace, Ponsonby. When the United States entered World War II, New Zealand experienced an influx of American service personnel bound for the Pacific theatre of operations. She ensured regular medical examinations for the female sex workers who lived in her venue. She lived on-site in an apartment, and had an affair with a naval lieutenant, who failed to return from the war.

While she was brought before the courts on the matter of "living off the proceeds of prostitution", this resulted in a hung jury twice, and she was not convicted thereafter. According to one witness, she was also solicitous about the spiritual welfare of her clients. When Flora died in 1982, her funeral was well-attended, for she had become a cherished civic figure, despite her occupational sideline.

== Ninette Gowns ==
Ninette Gowns was a New Zealand clothing retailer that operated between the early 1920s and 1958, and was located on the corner of Vulcan Lane and Queen Street in Auckland. Along with Trilby Yates and Bobby Angus, it is considered one of the founders of fashion design in New Zealand. It was started by MacKenzie in the 1920s and specialised in wedding and evening garments. By the late 1930s there were around eight staff, including embroiderers, steamers, cutters, sewers and an accountant. All of the garments were made onsite in an adjunct to the main salon. Bruce Papas completed a five-year apprenticeship at Ninette Gowns under the tutorship of Mackenzie. Mackenzie was "invested with a unique creative sensibility that filtered through every aspect of the enterprise" and the reputation of Ninette Gowns attracted affluent clientele from all over New Zealand.

Mackenzie was insistent on using high quality fabrics and would post swatches of fabric and her designs to clients for approval. The finished garment would also be sent by post, often with the original design sketch included. Mackenzie closed Ninette Gowns around 1958.
