= Eti Laufiso =

New Zealand policy writer and lecturer

'Eti' Mary Agnes Ivala-Laufiso QSM JP BEd
- Born: 2 November 1939; Sāmoa
- Died: 1 August 2009 (aged 69); Dunedin, New Zealand
- Education: Victoria University of Wellington
- Occupations: Educationalist, Pacific languages specialist
- Organization(s): New Zealand Ministry of Education, Dunedin College of Education
- Known for: Activism and advocacy for Pasifika New Zealanders and Pacific Islanders; Campaigning for civil rights Protesting 1981 Springbok tour of New Zealand and Foreshore and Seabed Bill
- Spouse: Mikaele (Filipo) Laufiso
- Children: Pip Laufiso, Marie Laufiso, four others
- Relatives: Filomena Tua'i and Ivala Leifi (parents)

Mary Agnes Ivala-Laufiso, known as Eti Laufiso (1939–2009), was a policy writer and lecturer specialising in the education of Pasifika New Zealanders and the teaching of Pacific languages. She was involved in founding several organisations advocating for the Pasifika community in New Zealand and in the Pacific Islands.

== Family ==
Mary Agnes Ivala was born in Sāmoa on 2 November, 1939, the second daughter of Filomena Tua'i and Ivala Leifi.

About 1962, she married Mikaele (Filipo) Laufiso, a worker on the Manapōuri Power Station hydro-electric development at Doubtful Sound / Patea and together they had six children, including local government politician Marie Laufiso and arts advisor Pip Laufiso. At the time of her death, she had eight grandchildren and two great-grandsons.

== Education ==
Eti attended St Mary's College, in Apia, and in 1960 was awarded a Western Samoan Government scholarship to study in New Zealand, which she had previously visited representing Western Samoa at a Girl Guides jamboree in Marton in 1956. She studied at Victoria University of Wellington then Dunedin Teachers' College, staying at Dominican Hall women's hostel where she was president in her second year, 1962. At this time she was one of only two Sāmoan women students in Dunedin.

Laufiso was in the first group of New Zealand school teachers to be trained to teach the Māori language in 1979. In 1981, she went to Wellington where she completed her Diploma in teaching English as a second language at Victoria University. She completed her bachelor of education in 2000 and completed a level one Te reo Māori course through Te Wananga O Aotearoa in July 2009.

== Career ==
In 1970, Laufiso began teaching at Green Island School. Over the following years she taught at Brockville School (1971-74) and Reid Park School in Mosgiel (1974-84). Teaching was sometimes supplemented by second or third jobs at St George's Jam, Cadbury's chocolate factory, the cafeteria at Wakari Hospital, and a hotel.

From the early 1980s Laufiso lectured in multicultural studies at Dunedin Teachers' College, was a visiting tutor for Pacific Island health and culture at the School of Nursing, and helped develop courses for new migrants.

Laufiso was shoulder-tapped for a job in the Department of Education as Pacific Islands education officer, co-ordinating initiatives for early childhood education, Pacific language, teaching, and community engagement.

In 1986, she was instrumental in the opening of the first Pacific Islands early childhood centre, and for the next few years was the director for the national course on Pacific Island issues in education. She became a senior policy analyst for the Ministry of Education in 1989 with responsibility for Pacific Island education and ESOL projects. She advised the Ministry of Education on the Samoan language syllabus and the Tokelauan language curriculum.

In 1995, she returned to the Dunedin College of Education where she co-ordinated and delivered a diploma for Pacific Island early childhood education.

== Activism ==
At the time of the 1981 Springbok rugby tour of New Zealand Laufiso became active as a protester in both Wellington and Dunedin, including asking son Michael to quit playing rugby.

She and her husband both joined in the Sāmoan community's mobilisation against the proposed Immigration Bill of 1984. They worked through Fagasa, a Sāmoan teachers' and parents' group which focused on the maintenance and survival of the Sāmoan language in New Zealand. The couple also helped establish the Dunedin Sāmoan Catholic community centre in Corstorphine.

Laufiso travelled to Wellington to participate in the 2004 hikoi on the Foreshore and Seabed legislation.

== Advocacy ==
In 1983, Laufiso became a Justice of the Peace. She was instrumental in the establishment of the national Pacific women's organisation Pacifica Inc in 1977. She was president from 1984 to 1988. She was a member of the first South Pacific Arts Council, a forerunner to Creative New Zealand.

Laufiso was co-founder of the Pacific Island Aids Trust which helped develop and deliver HIV/AIDS prevention education to the Pasifika community in New Zealand. She also travelled to other Pacific nations to promote HIV/AIDS education and helped develop a programme against sexual abuse and violence for the Sāmoan community.

== Honours ==
Laufiso's work in the community was recognised with a Queen's Service Medal in the 1990 New Year Honours.

In 2003 Pacifica Inc honoured Laufiso as a "living legacy".

== Death ==
Eti Laufiso survived a brain tumour in 2000 after 5 months in hospital. She died in Dunedin on 1 August 2009, aged 69 following a second tumour. Shortly before her death Laufiso told Tagata Pasifika "I have lived my life to the fullest length and enjoyed it and I thank God for letting me live ... I don't see myself as someone who has something to pass on; we just live."

New Zealand's Ministry of Pacific Island Affairs paid tribute, calling her a champion of Pacific grassroots communities, citing her work with early childhood education, language nests and bilingualism.
