= Matafetu Smith =

Niuean weaver

Matafetu Smith MNZM
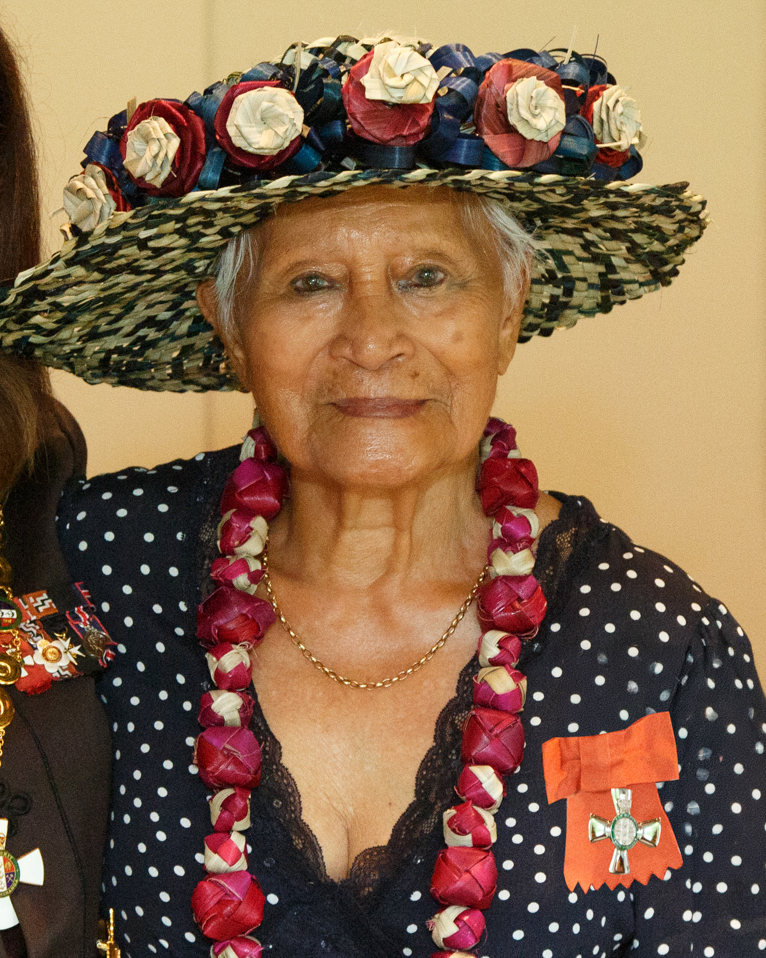
- Smith in 2026
- Born: Mokafetu Togakilo; 1931 or 1932 (age 94–95); Niue
- Known for: Polynesian weaving

Mokafetu "Matafetu" Smith MNZM (née Togakilo; born 1931 or 1932) is a weaver and community activist from Niue. She founded the first Niuean weaving group in Auckland, and her work is held in the collections of Auckland War Memorial Museum and Te Papa.

== Early life ==
Smith was born in Niue in 1931 or 1932. As a child, she watched her grandmother weave, and enjoyed dancing around her village.

== Career ==
In 1984, Smith founded the first Niuean weaving group in Auckland, called Tufuga Mataponiu a Niue. She eventually ran several groups for women from separate villages in Niue. In 1984, she was appointed to the Council for Māori and South Pacific Arts for a three-year term. She was reappointed to a second term in 1987.

Smith's sister, Eseta Patii, was also a weaver. Smith is also a dancer and choreographer, working with women's groups. She is also a former co-ordinator of the Niue Village at the Pasifika Festival.

In 2000, Smith attended the Pacific Arts Festival in Nouméa. In 2007, she accompanied the governor-general, Anand Satyanand, to Niue, where a symposium of Niuean weaving was held. In 2009, she was appointed to Creative New Zealand's Pacific Arts Committee, alongside Frances Hartnell.

== Legacy ==
Auckland War Memorial Museum has one of Smith's designs in its collection. Two woven pieces by her are in the Te Papa collection: a basket called a Kato Fuakina and an 'ei (headpiece). Works created by weaving groups that Smith facilitated are held in the collection of the University of Auckland.

== Honours and awards ==
In 2006, Smith was one of 12 inaugural inductees as a Waitakere arts laureate. She has also received the Creative New Zealand Senior Pacific Artist award. In the 2026 New Year Honours, Smith was appointed a Member of the New Zealand Order of Merit, for services to Pacific art.
