= Mary Jane Milne =

New Zealand milliner and businesswoman

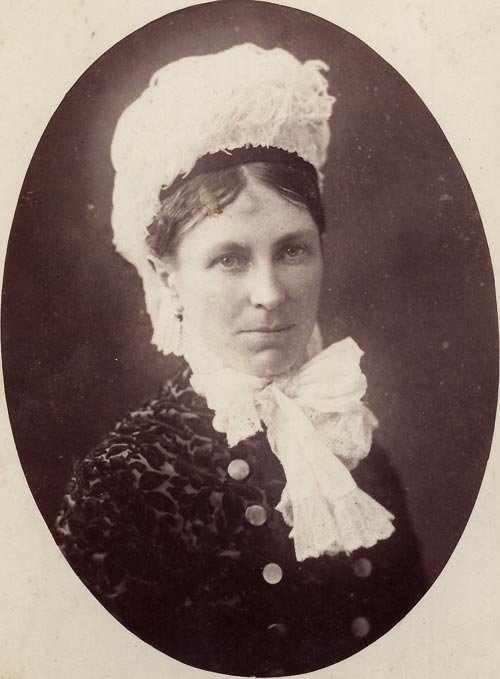
Mary Jane Milne, circa 1880.

Mary Jane Milne (16 September 1840 – 4 April 1921) was a New Zealand milliner and businesswoman, known as a co-owner of the Milne & Choyce department store in Auckland.

== Biography ==
She was born in Coalisland, County Tyrone, Ireland, on 16 September 1840. The family left Ireland in July 1863.

After arriving in New Zealand, Milne was employed as head milliner at Robert Graham's soft goods store in Shortland St. In 1866, partnering with her sister Charlotte, they took over a haberdashery and draper's store in Wyndham Street, relaunching as M & C Milne a "Millinery and Drapery Establishment". In 1875 Charlotte married Henry Choyce, and after the birth of their first child Henry replaced Charlotte as Mary Jane's business partner and the business was renamed Milne & Choyce.

Milne retired at the age of seventy in 1909, but remained involved in Milne & Choyce until her death in 1921.

In 2012, Milne was posthumously inducted into the New Zealand Business Hall of Fame.
