= Farmers (department store) =

New Zealand department store chain

Farmers Trading Company Ltd
- Trade name: Farmers
- Company type: Private
- Industry: Retail
- Founded: October 1909; 116 years ago
- Founder: Robert Laidlaw
- Headquarters: Flat Bush, Auckland, New Zealand
- Number of locations: 58 (2025)
- Area served: New Zealand
- Products: Department store
- Parent: Chase Corporation (1987–1991); State Bank of South Australia (1991–1992); Farmers Deka (1992–1993); Foodland Associated (1993–2003); James Pascoe Group (2003–present)
- Website: farmers.co.nz

Farmers Trading Company Ltd (branded as Farmers) is a New Zealand mid-market department store chain. Headquartered in Flat Bush, Auckland, Farmers operates 58 stores across New Zealand, specialising in family fashion, beauty, homewares, furniture, large appliances and whiteware.

== History ==
=== Early years ===
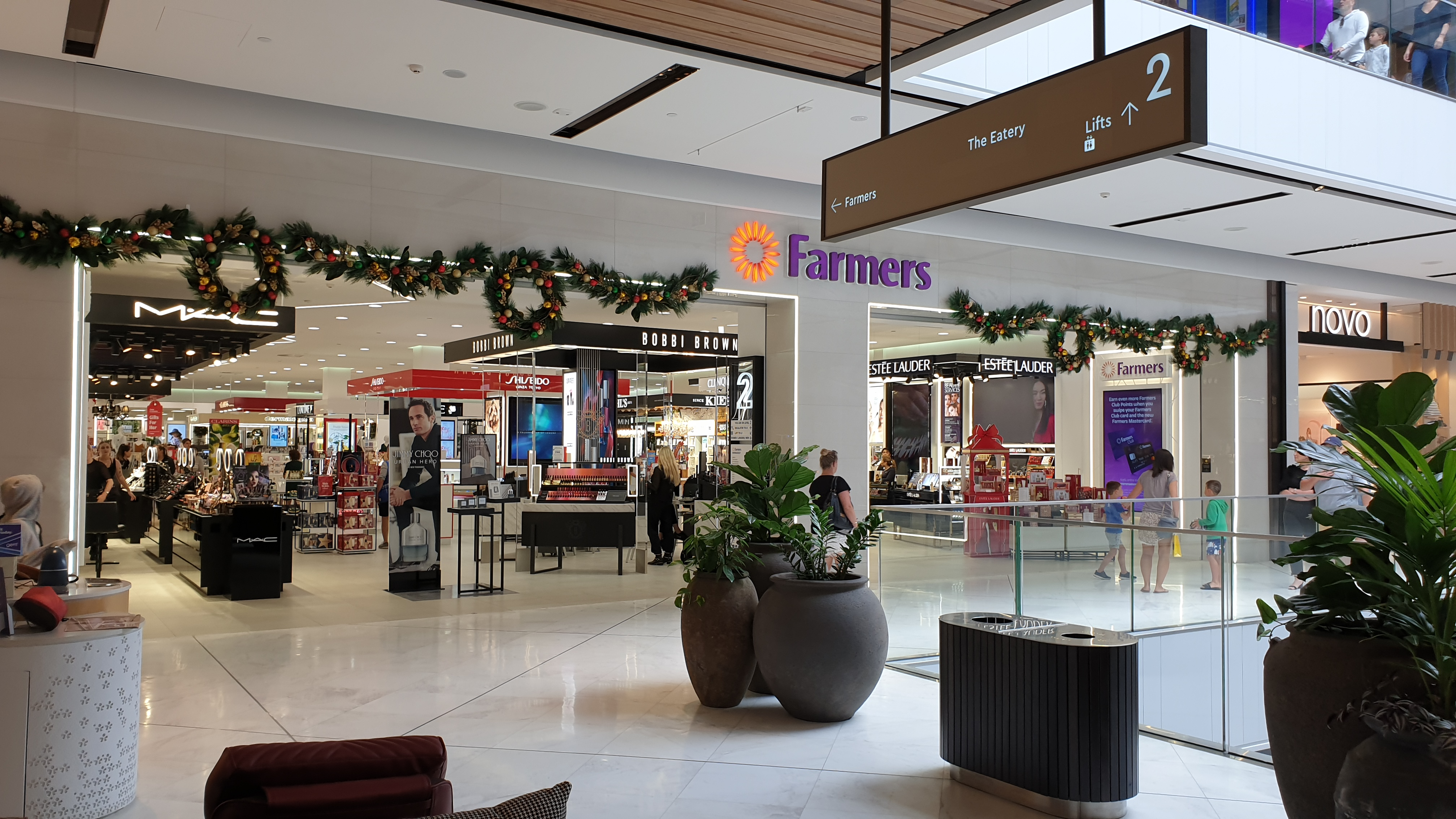
Farmers department store within Westfield Newmarket

Robert Laidlaw founded Laidlaw Leeds in 1909, which sold agricultural supplies through mail order catalogues, following a successful American model. In 1910, a group of Auckland members of the Farmers Union formed the Farmers Union Indenting and Trading Association. The Clevedon branch, for instance, approved the formation of such an association at a meeting held in July 1910. In 1916, the trading association was converted into the Farmers' Union Trading Co (Auckland) Ltd.

In 1917, the Farmers' Union Trading Company approached Laidlaw Leeds with an offer to merge, which Laidlaw accepted; he became the managing director of the new venture, the Farmers' Trading Company. The company soon expanded into retail and adopted the department store model. There had also been an unrelated, older Farmers Department Store in Sydney, Australia.

=== From mail order to stores ===
The centre of operations was a high-rise warehouse and office complex in Auckland's Hobson Street. In 1920 a retail space was opened to the public in the building. The co-op also bought many local stores in the Auckland province in 1920, by which time it had 32 stores, and offered preference shares to urban members.

In the 1930s a large wing was built onto the older 1914 building which included the Harbour View Tea Rooms. The architect involved, R. A. Lippencott, also gave the enlarged building a new facade in the new modern Art-Deco style. Hobson Street was not a very good position for a department store, so copying similar arrangements by stores in American cities, Laidlaw arranged for a free bus to shuttle people from Queen Street to the Hobson Street store. This was later augmented by a free tram to Karangahape Road.

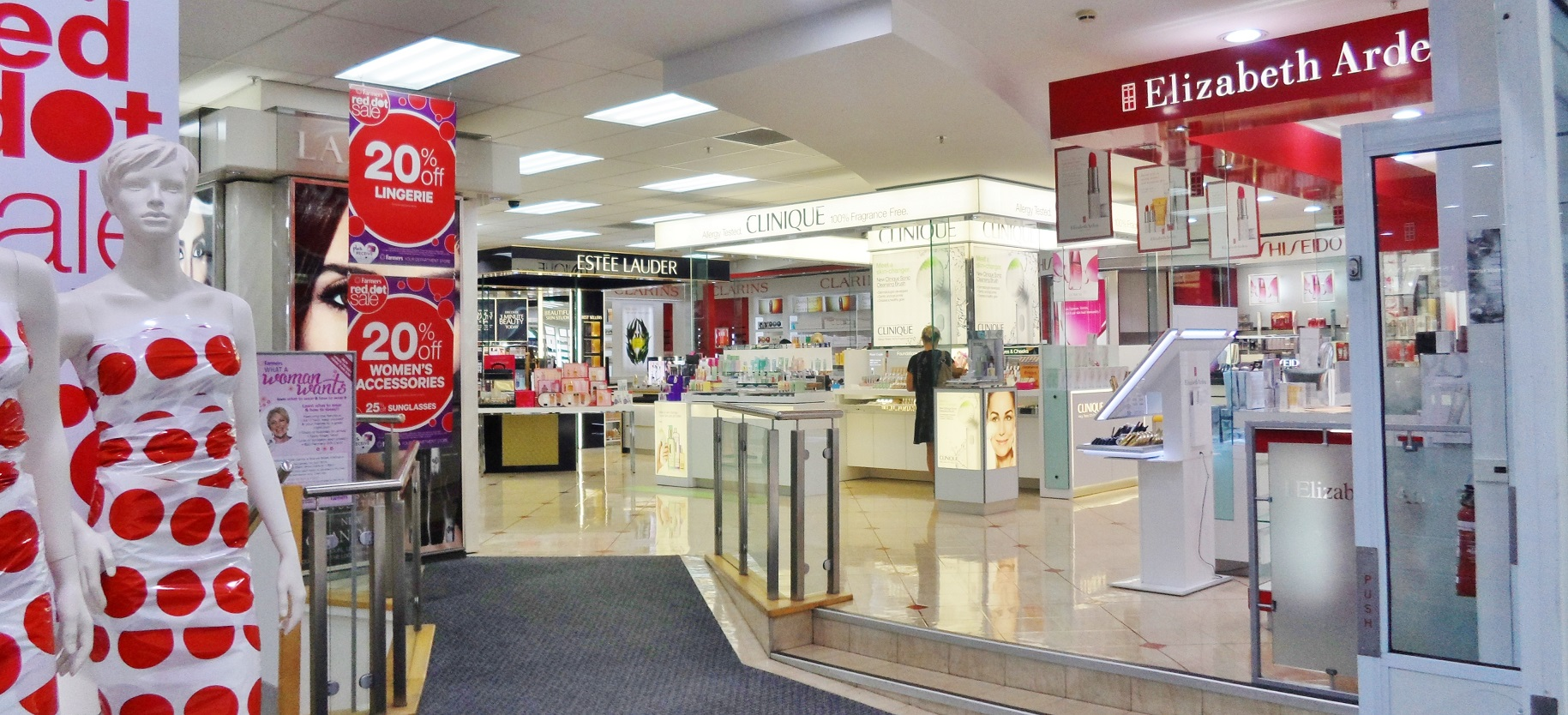
Cosmetics at Farmers Lambton Quay

Over successive years the adjacent sites were covered with warehouses and administration blocks for the growing business. Laidlaw, a teetotaler, made a point of buying the pub directly next door, The Grosvenor, and turning it into offices.

As well as the store's rooftop playground and tearooms, Farmers was also noted for its high-rise parking building connected to the shop by an elevated skyway. Like many buildings from the 1920s onwards, it had electric lifts which multiplied in number as the building grew in size. The store also boasted the first escalators in Auckland which were opened in 1955 by the Mayor of Auckland City, Mr. J H Luxford and his wife. The Mayor cut the ribbon and the official party travelled up the escalators followed by a crowd of curious Aucklanders, along with the store's mascot Hector the parrot. The eight banks of escalators were the largest installation in the Southern Hemisphere.

=== South Island expansion ===
In 1970, Farmers acquired Calder Mackay, a Christchurch-based department store with branches around the South Island. Following the purchase Farmers became the largest department store chain in New Zealand.

In 1982, following Bunting & Co.'s purchase of the Christchurch-based Farmers-Haywrights department store chain (unrelated to the Farmers Trading Company), Farmers purchased 13 Farmers-Haywrights stores for $12 Million, bringing the total Farmers store count to 80.

=== Changes of ownership ===
In 1986, Farmers was taken over by New Zealand property development company Chase Corporation. In May 1989 the Chase Corporation announced that it was considering a sale of the chain, with Australian department store David Jones expressing interest in purchasing the company. At the time Farmers had a turnover of $500 million.

In September 1989, The Press reported that Lion Nathan was planning to purchase up to 10 Farmers stores and rebrand them to DEKA, in return Farmers would acquire the Lion Nathan owned James Smith department store chain. In October 1989, Farmers declined a purchase offer from Fay Richwite who intended to re-list the company on the New Zealand Stock Exchange.

Later in October 1989, Lion Nathan purchased 8 Farmers stores (Cambridge, Dargaville, Glenfield, Kaikohe, Morrinsville, Pukekohe, Richmond, Wainuiomata) and rebranded them to DEKA. Farmers had 50 remaining stores in its fleet following the sale.

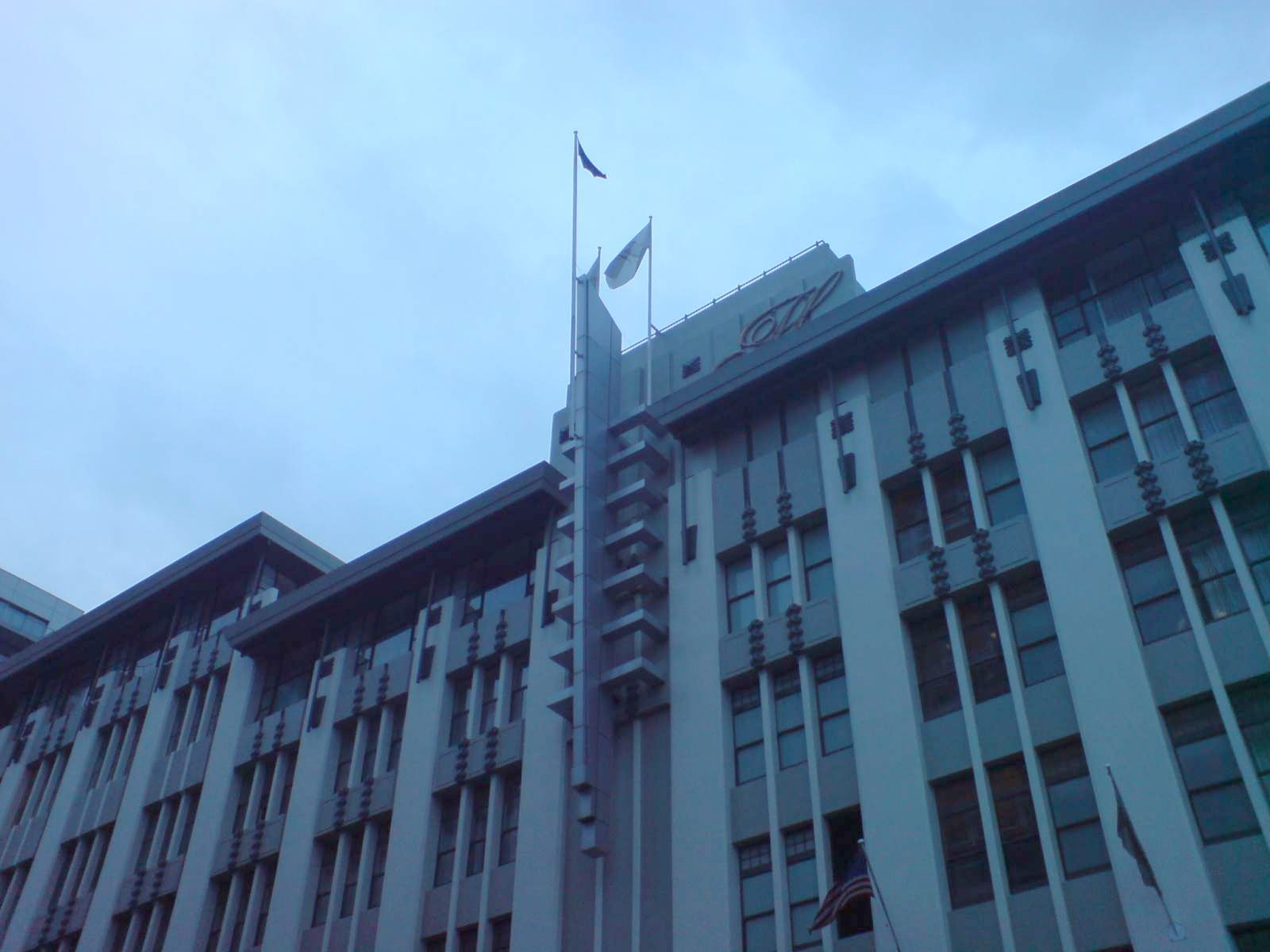
The historic flagship store in the Auckland CBD, now a hotel

The Auckland flagship store closed in 1991, standing empty until it was converted into an upscale hotel that opened in 1998.

In 1992, Farmers was sold to New Zealand discounter DEKA. Following the sale the parent company was renamed as Farmers Deka Ltd (stores retained separate Farmers and DEKA branding).

DEKA stores closed in July 2001 after financial difficulty. Farmers Deka Ltd was then renamed to Farmers Holdings Ltd.

In 2003 Farmers was purchased by James Pascoe Ltd (now the James Pascoe Group)

=== Contemporary era ===
Farmers closed its Queen Street, Auckland, store in rented premises in 2014 after ending a long-term lease. In November 2015, the company opened a new Auckland CBD store located on the corner of Queen and Victoria Streets, formerly occupied by stationery retailer Whitcoulls, renovating it as a three-level Farmers department store.

In 2021 there were calls for Farmers and its parent the James Pascoe Group to repay the money it took from the COVID-19 wage subsidies programme of which Farmers claimed over NZ$28 million for its over 3700 staff.

Farmers was traditionally a middle-market retailer, on par with Sears or JCPenney in the United States. With the development of the large-format discount department store The Warehouse, Farmers decided to become a 'more fashionable shopping destination', introducing more label products. Where Farmers once would have faced competition from The Warehouse and various small chain stores, they have established themselves apart from being a discount department store. Farmers still face competition from remaining department stores Ballantynes and David Jones none of which are nationwide (though both Ballantynes and David Jones are upmarket stores, whilst Farmers serves the upper middle-market akin to Macy's or Debenhams).

== Departments ==
Farmers departments include womenswear, beauty, including serviced cosmetics, fine fragrance, health & beauty and sunglasses; lingerie, including sleepwear; menswear including mercery; accessories, footwear, and luggage; home, including kitchenware, tableware, giftware and laundry; manchester including bathroomware; small appliances; children's including childrenswear, nursery, and toys; furniture; with electronics and large appliances/whiteware in selected stores. Christmas Shop and confectionery appear October–December. Fellow James Pascoe Group companies Goldmark and Stevens also have store-within-a-store outlets within selected Farmers stores.

Since the 2003 purchase by the James Pascoe Group, the chain has focussed on the lucrative fashion apparel and beauty categories. Unprofitable and loss-making departments such as hardware and computers were discontinued.

== Ownership ==
Farmers is privately owned by the James Pascoe Group, in turn owned by Anne Norman and family. James Pascoe Ltd and Fisher & Paykel Finance bought Farmers on 6 November 2003 from Foodlands Associates for NZ$311 million. The business was split into the retail and finance arms with James Pascoe holding the retail arm and Fisher & Paykel Finance the finance arm which includes the Farmers Finance Card.

== Gallery ==
Previous Farmers Trading Company logo

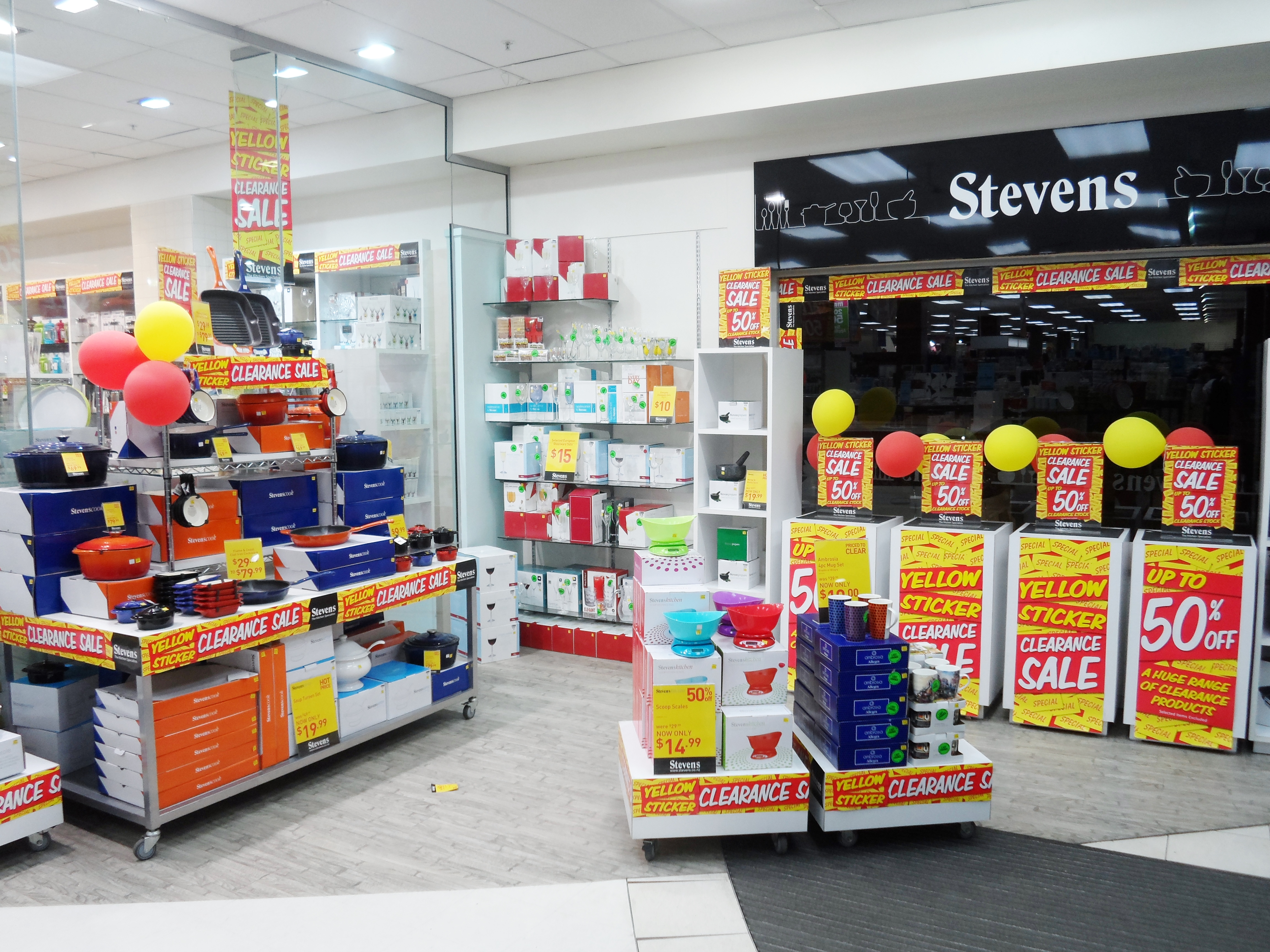
Stevens Dunedin within Farmers Dunedin

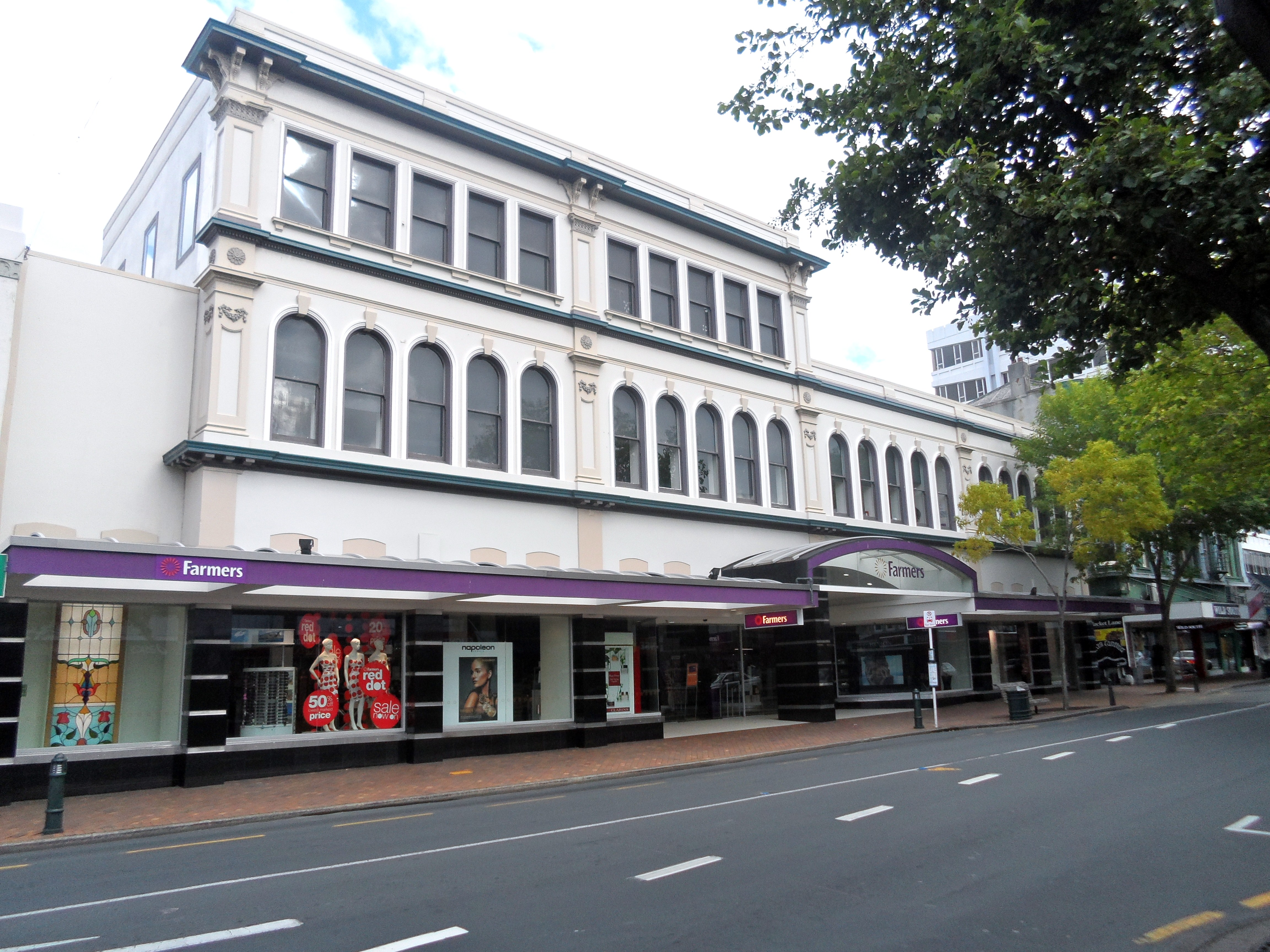
Farmers Dunedin

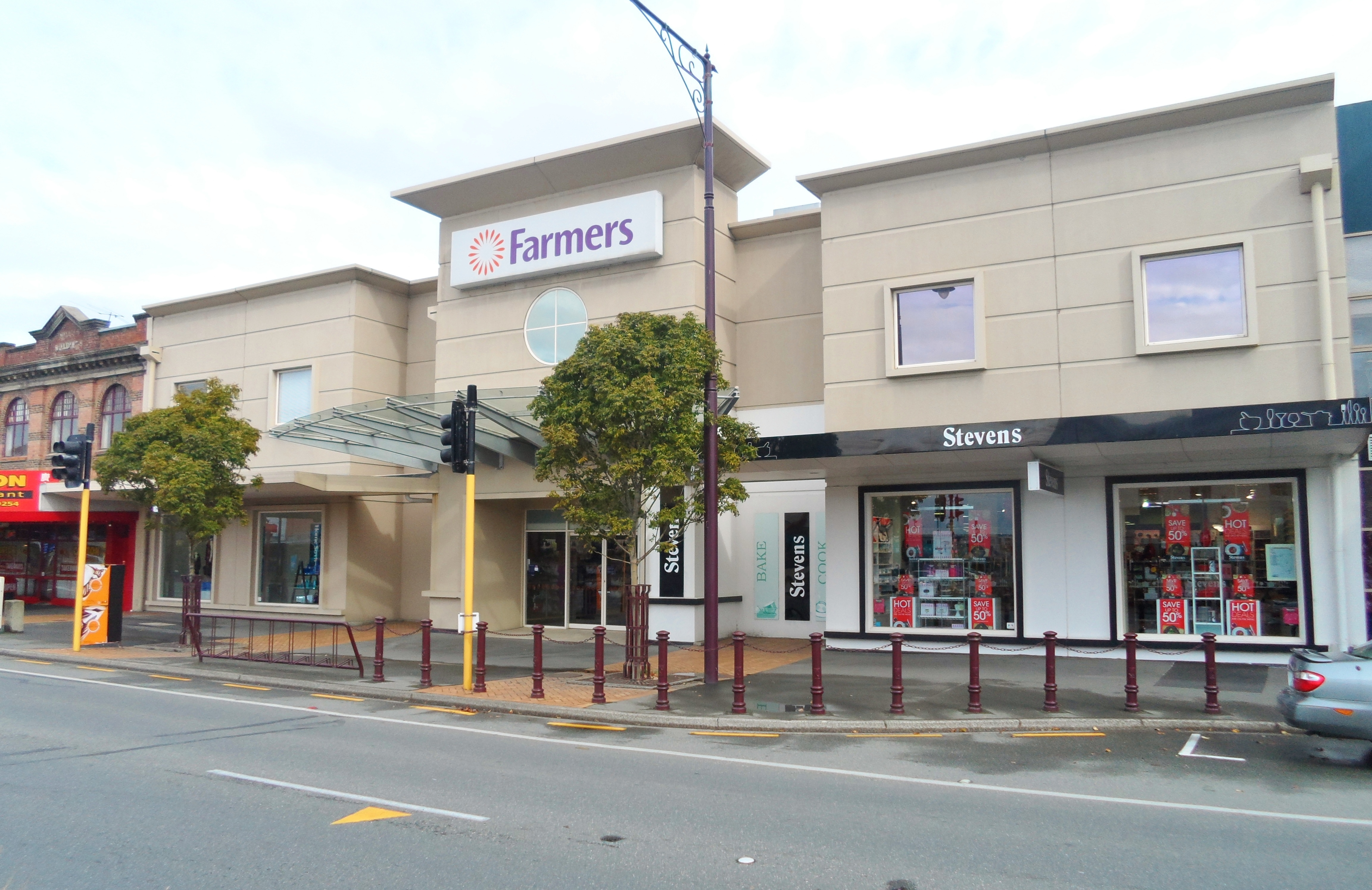
Farmers Invercargill (now relocated)

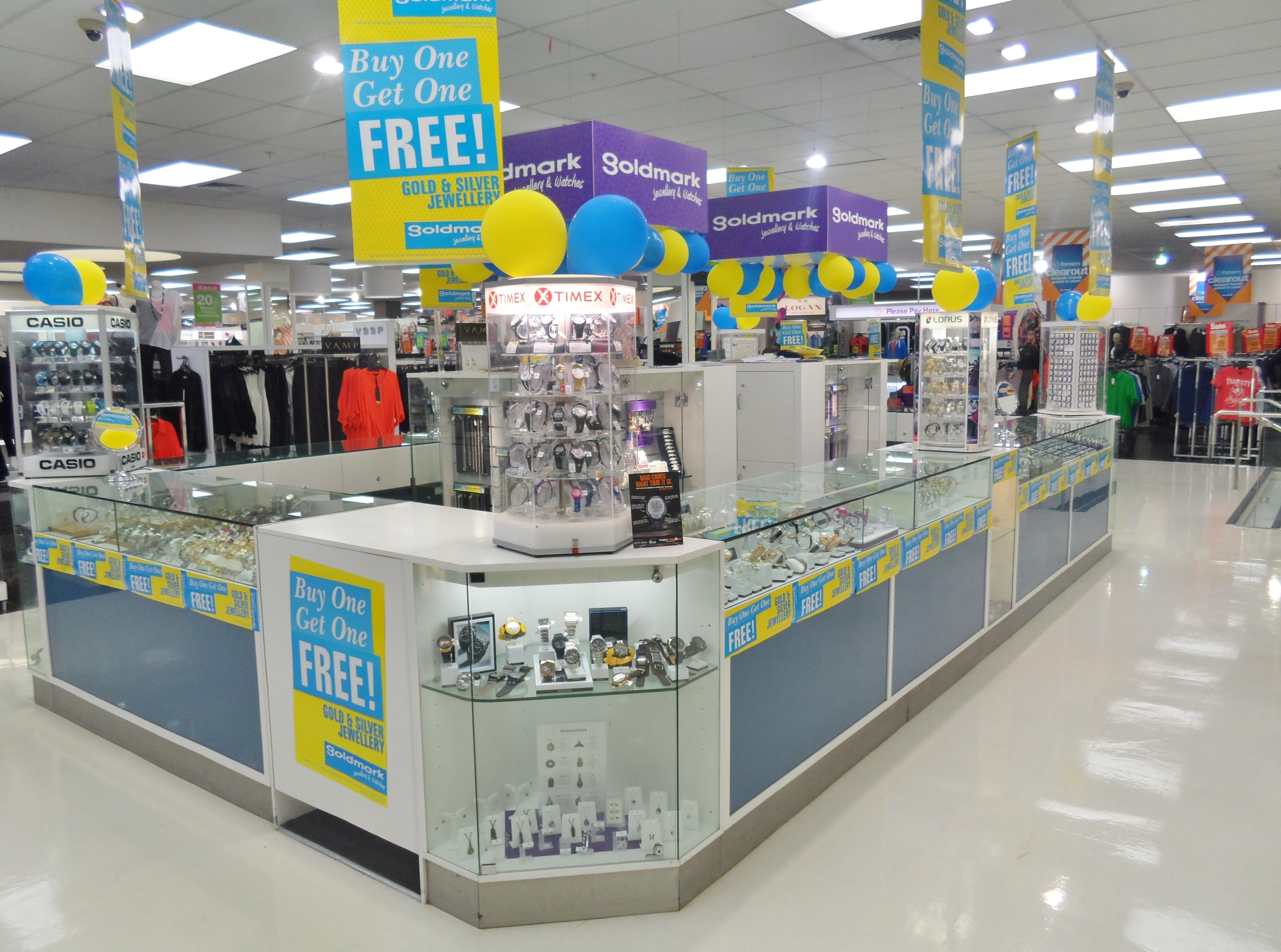
Goldmark within Farmers Dunedin

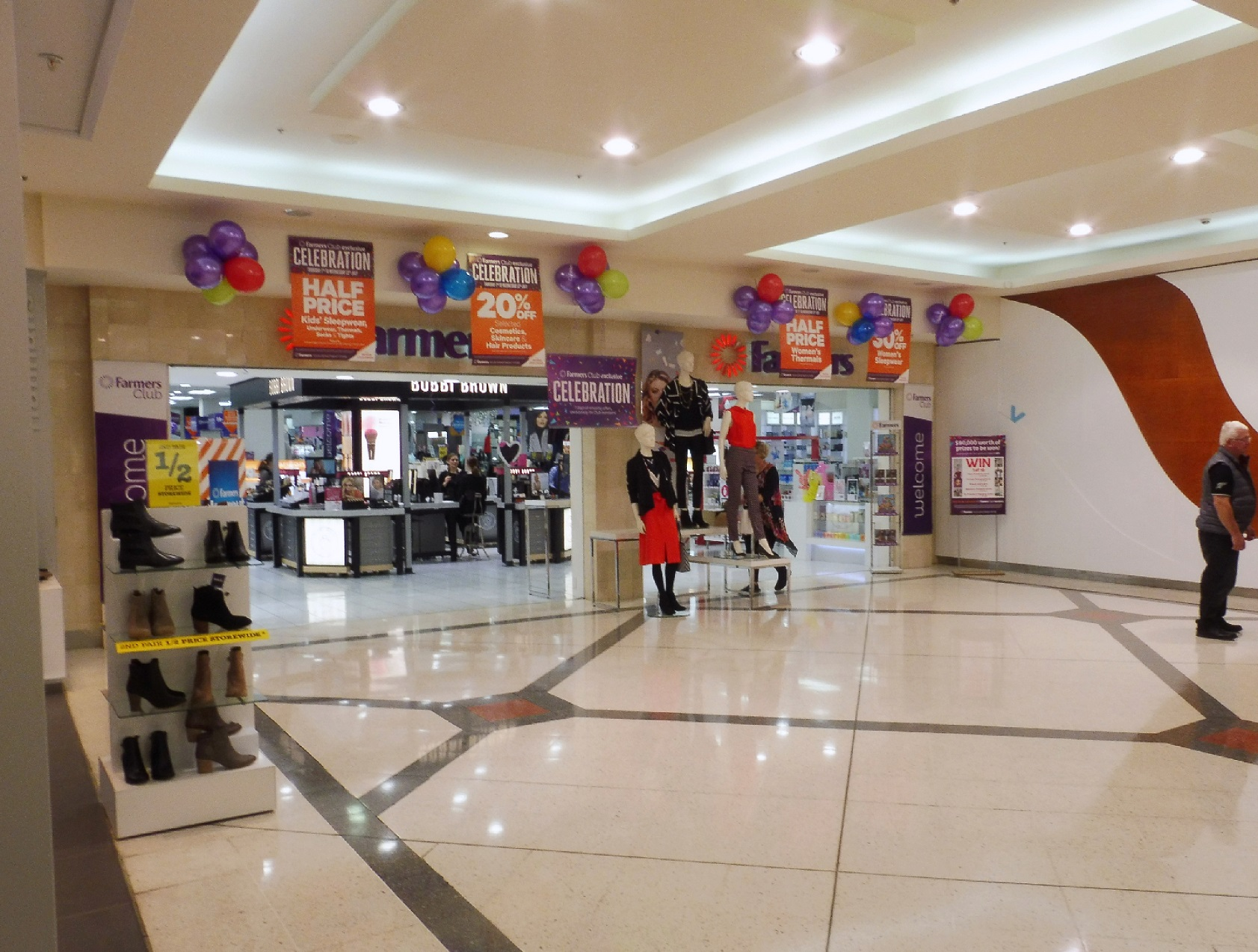
Farmers at Westfield Riccarton

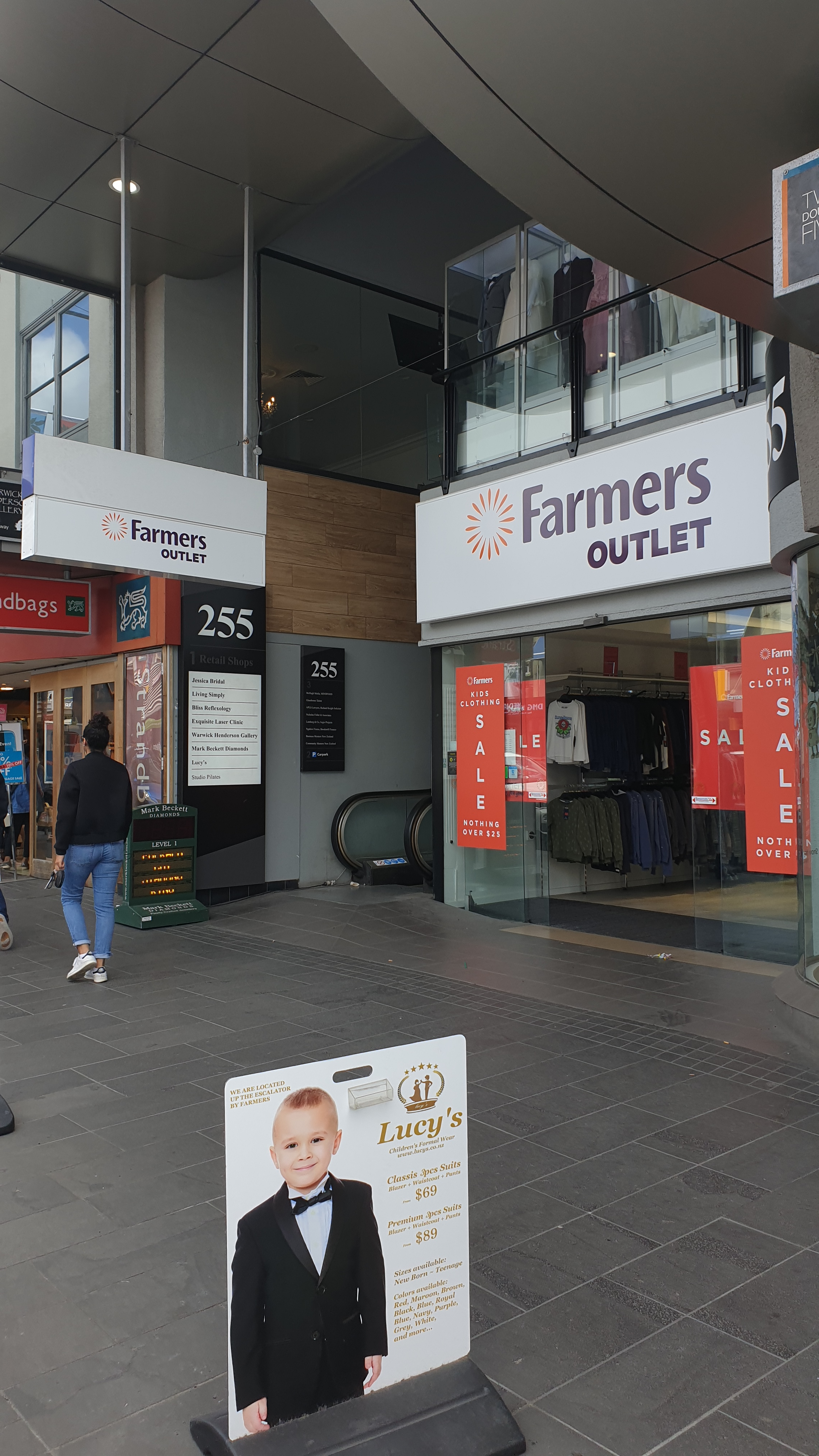
Farmers Outlet store in Newmarket, Auckland (now closed)
