= Pip Laufiso =

New Zealand arts advisor

Pip Laufiso MNZM BAM
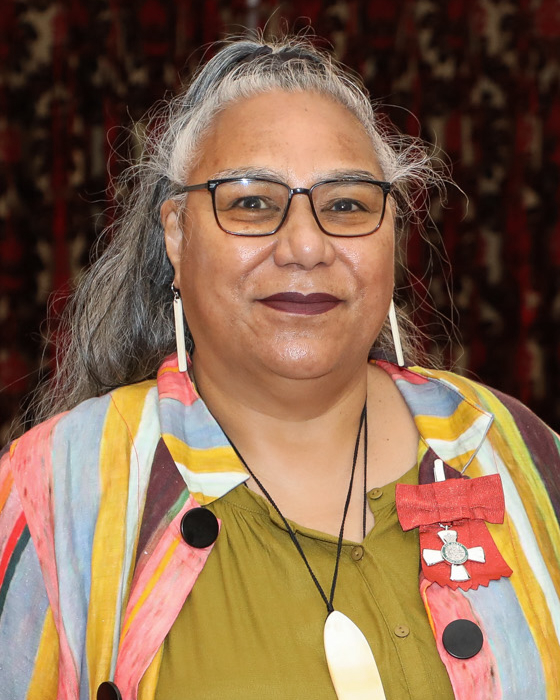
- Laufiso in 2024
- Spouse: Hiliako Iaheto
- Children: 1
- Relatives: Agnes (Eti) Ivala (mother) Marie Laufiso (sister)
- Awards: Member of the New Zealand Order of Merit

Academic work
- Institutions: Ministry of Education of New Zealand

Phillippa Agnes Laufiso (known as Pip) MNZM is a New Zealand arts advisor. She is general manager of the Otago Polyfest. In 2024 she was appointed a Member of the New Zealand Order of Merit for services to the arts and the community. In 2026, Laufiso became the inaugural chairperson of the organisation Pasifika Festivals Aotearoa.

== Family ==
Laufiso was born and raised in Dunedin. Her mother was Agnes Mary (Eti) Ivala-Laufiso, who was awarded a Queen's Service Medal in 1990 for her public service. She married Hiliako Iaheto and the couple had a son. Pip Laufiso's sister Marie is a Dunedin City Councillor.

== Career ==
Laufiso is general manager of the Otago Polyfest, and works for the Ministry of Education. Polyfest was unsuccessful in a 2026 bid to Creative New Zealand for ongoing funding, despite having run for 33 years, but chair Ange Kiore said the festival would continue to run. Laufiso questioned whether the festival missed out on funding due to the young age of the performers. Laufiso is on the board of the Otago Community Trust, and is an advisor to the University of Otago’s Secondary to Tertiary Transitions Project. Laufiso is the Chair of Pasifika Festivals Aotearoa, a national umbrella organisation established in 2026 to support and promote more than 40 Pacific-led festivals across the country.

== Honours ==
Laufiso received a Dunedin Stars merit award in 2009 citing her work with families and young people, Polyfest, and benefit concerts following the 2009 Samoa earthquake and tsunami

In the 2024 New Year Honours, Laufiso was appointed a Member of the New Zealand Order of Merit, for services to the arts and the community.
