= Jean Wishart =

New Zealand magazine editor (1920–2016)

Jean Wishart OBE
- Born: Jean Boughton Wishart; 8 October 1920; Auckland, New Zealand
- Died: 16 November 2016 (aged 96); Auckland, New Zealand
- Known for: Editor of New Zealand Woman's Weekly (1952–1985)

Jean Boughton Wishart OBE (8 October 1920 – 16 November 2016) was a New Zealand journalist who was the editor of the New Zealand Woman's Weekly from 1952 until 1985.

== Biography ==
Born in the Auckland suburb of Remuera on 8 October 1920, Wishart was the daughter of Florence Olivia Marianne Wishart (née Cadman) and Robert Wishart. She was educated at Epsom Girls' Grammar School and joined the New Zealand Woman's Weekly as an office girl when she left school. She eventually rose to become the magazine's editor in 1952. During her 33-year tenure as editor—the longest in the magazine's history—circulation increased from about 100,000 to a peak of 250,000 in the early 1980s.

She served as a director of NZ News Ltd from 1975, becoming the first women to be appointed to the board of a public company, she was also a member of the council of the Auckland Chamber of Commerce.

In the 1985 Queen's Birthday Honours, Wishart was appointed an Officer of the Order of the British Empire, for services to journalism.

Wishart never married. She died in Auckland on 16 November 2016 at the age of 96.

Media offices
Preceded by	Editor of New Zealand Woman's Weekly; 1952–1985	Succeeded by Michal McKay
