= Emma Knuckey =

New Zealand fashion designer (1913–1998)

- Born: Emma Cecilia Campbell; 14 December 1912; New Plymouth, New Zealand
- Died: 12 December 1998 (aged 85); Auckland, New Zealand
- Occupation: Fashion designer

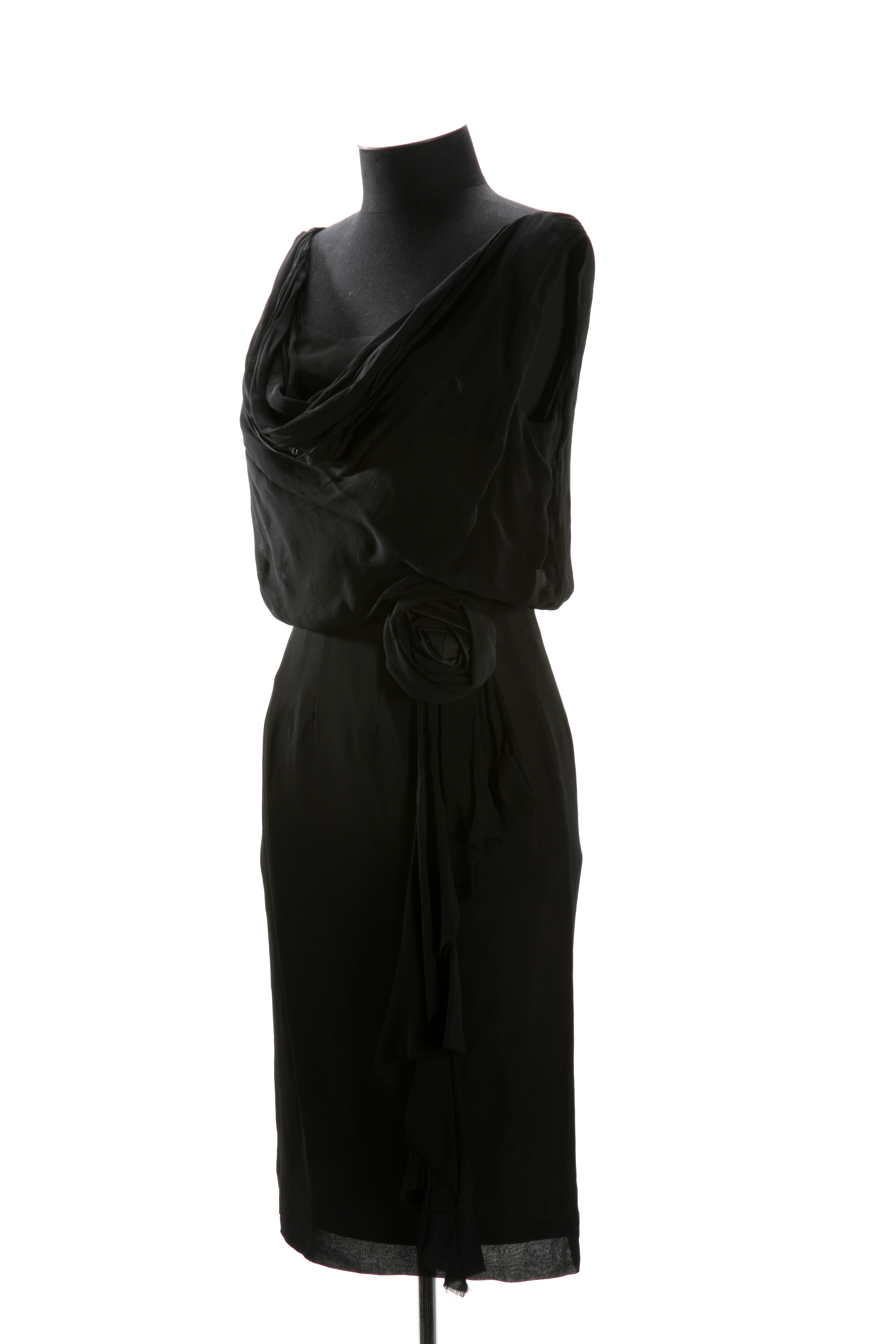
Silk chiffon dress designed by Valsean Simpson circa 1963–64. Made in Auckland New Zealand

Emma Cecilia Knuckey (née Campbell; 14 December 1912 – 12 December 1998) was a pioneering New Zealand fashion designer, known for her evening gowns. Her work is currently held at Auckland Museum, Te Papa and the MTG Hawke's Bay.

== Early life ==
Knuckey was born in 1912 in New Plymouth. Her grandmother owned a drapery shop and her mother was a seamstress, their influence led to her interest in design. Without any formal training Knuckey began to design garments.

In the mid-1940s Knuckey sent some of her designs to London designer Frederick Starke, founder of the London Model House Group. He invited her to London to meet with British designers and study under them. In 1949 she went to London with her husband to study at the Model House group. Through her studies she learned pattern making and was also heavily influenced by the atmosphere of designers studios and the style in which design labels were launched.

== Career ==
In 1950 she opened her first salon 'Gowns by Emma Knuckey.' She modeled the opening of the Salon off what she had seen in London, 'I opened my business with an exciting fashion show – rows of small chairs, invitations, flowers, soft lights and music." Shortly after opening Knuckey formed a business partnership with Betty Clarke, one of her employees.

Due to limits on the quality of fabric that could be sourced in New Zealand Knuckey imported the majority of fabric used from overseas. She imported material from England, Switzerland, Ireland and Scotland. The emphasis of her designs was on the quality of the fabric she used.

In 1959, 'Gowns by Emma Knuckey' closed as the business partners moved to sell their clothes through wholesale. Their garments were sold through New Zealand's main department stores which included Milne & Choyce, Smith & Caughey's and Kirkcaldie & Stains.

Knuckey returned to retail in 1971 as she opened a new store of her own on Darby street, not far from the original salon. This opening saw a change in the style of clothes sold as mini skirts and hot pants began to be incorporated into Knuckey's designs.

She retired from fashion in 1974 and died in 1998.

In March 2017 Emma Knuckey's work was exhibited in Walk the Walk: A History of Fashion in the City at Smith & Caughey’s in Auckland where Knuckey's clothing was once sold.
