= Richard Argall =

English poet

Richard Argall (fl. c. 1621) was an English poet active in the early 17th century.

== Life ==
Argall's name appears on the title-page of a unique volume of poems (1621, 4to), once in Samuel Christie-Miller's library at Britwell. The contents of this volume are: (1) 'The Bride's Ornament, Poetical Essays upon a Divine Subject;' (2) 'A Funeral Elegy consecrated to the memory of his ever honoured lord, John King, late Bishop of London;' (3) 'The Song of Songs metaphrased in English heroicks.' Anthony a Wood, sub 'John Argall', writes: 'Now I am got into the name of Argall I must let the reader know that in my searches I find one Richard Argall to be noted in the reign of King James I for an excellent divine poet, having been much encouraged in his studies by Dr. Jo, King, bishop of London, but in what house educated in Oxon, where he spent some time in study, I cannot now tell you.' After enumerating the works mentioned above, he proceeds: 'He also wrote a book of meditations of knowledge, zeal, temperance, bounty, and joy. And another containing meditations of prudence, obedience, meekness, God's word, and prayer. (These latter unpublished.)' But it is very doubtful whether a poet of the name of Richard Argall ever existed.

In 1654, the "Bride's Ornament" and the "Meditations" were included in a collection of the poems of Robert Aylett, one of the masters of the High Court of Chancery. It is unlikely that the name Richard Argall had been adopted as a nom de plume, and it is equally unlikely that a man in Aylett's position would have had the impudence to reissue another person's verses under his own name. From the fact that only one copy is known of the early edition it might be suggested that Aylett, learning of the attempted fraud, succeeded in calling in the copies that had gone abroad under Argall's name. (A Richard Argall, of Emmanuel College, Cambridge, was rector of Aythorpe Roding, Essex; he married into the family of the Bramstons.)

Attribution

This article incorporates text from a publication now in the public domain: Bullen, Arthur Henry (1885). "Argall, Richard". In Stephen, Leslie (ed.). Dictionary of National Biography. Vol. 2. London: Smith, Elder & Co.
