= New Zealand Woman's Weekly =

New Zealand magazine founded 1932

- Editor: Marilynn McLachlan
- Categories: Women's magazines
- Frequency: Weekly
- Circulation: 82,040 (2011)
- Founder: Otto Williams; Audrey Argall
- First issue: 8 December 1932; 93 years ago
- Company: Are Media
- Country: New Zealand
- Language: New Zealand English
- Website: www.nowtolove.co.nz/nz-womans-weekly/

The New Zealand Woman's Weekly is a weekly New Zealand women's magazine published by Are Media. As of 2011, it had a circulation of 82,040, third by paid sales after TV Guide and Are Media's New Zealand Woman's Day.

== History ==
On 8 December 1932, journalists Otto Williams and Audrey Argall launched the magazine, with 7,000 copies on newsprint. Williams took the role of managing director, and Argall was the first editor. Due to financial difficulties, they were forced to sell the magazine after three months. Ellen Melville ran the magazine for a few weeks, before the magazine's printer, F. S. Proctor, and his wife, took over. Early in 1933, solicitor Vernon Dyson bought it, and his wife Hedda became the second editor. At the end of the year it was sold again to Brett Print and Publishing Co., later New Zealand Newspapers, which also published the Auckland Star. Hedda Dyson was retained as editor.

In the early 1980s, New Zealand Woman's Weekly's circulation peaked at around 250,000, before the Australian magazines Woman's Day and New Idea entered the New Zealand market.

In 2007, the magazine celebrated its 75th anniversary with guest Prime Minister Helen Clark.

In early April 2020, the Bauer Media Group announced that it would be closing several of its New Zealand brands in response to the economic impact of the COVID-19 pandemic in New Zealand including the New Zealand Woman's Weekly.

On 17 June 2020, Mercury Capital purchased the New Zealand Woman's Weekly as part of its acquisition of Bauer Media's Australia and New Zealand assets. On 17 July, Mercury Capital announced that it would resume publishing the Women's Weekly and other former Bauer publications. In late September 2020, Mercury Capital rebranded Bauer Media as Are Media, which took over publication of the Woman's Weekly.

== Editors ==
- Audrey Argall, 1932–1933
- Hedda Dyson, 1933–1948
- Ola Rudman, 1948–1952
- Jean Wishart, 1952–1984
- Michal McKay, 1984–1987
- Jenny Lynch, 1987–1994
- Sarah Kate Lynch, 1994–1996
- Wendyl Nissen, 1996–1997
- Rowan Dixon, 1997–2003
- Nicky Pellegrino, 2003
- 2003–2006: no editor? stopped publishing?
- Sido Kitchin, 2006–2010
- Nicky Pellegrino (acting), 2010
- Sarah Stuart, 2010–2013
- Louise Wright, 2013–2014
- Fiona Fraser, 2014–2016
- Alice O'Connell, 2016–2020
- Marilynn McLachlan, 2020–2026

== See also ==
- List of women's magazines
