= Audrey Argall =

Founder of New Zealand Women's Weekly (1898–1981)

Audrey Argall (later Argall-Glasgow, 20 December 1898 – 22 June 1981) was a New Zealand freelance writer and magazine editor.

== Early life and family ==
Born in Coromandel on 20 December 1898, Argall was the daughter of Albert Edward Argall, a gold mine manager, and Mary Selina Argall (née Clymo). In the 1920s and 1930s, Argall lived in the provincial New Zealand town of Paeroa, where she helped her aunt run a nursing home.

== Writing and editing ==
Argall wrote fiction and poetry in her spare time. In 1931, she won a short-story competition run by the magazine Australian Woman's Mirror, with her entry Farewell Pioneer, an historical romance.

In 1932, Argall was invited to edit a new magazine, the New Zealand Woman's Weekly, which was launched in December of that year. She wrote articles for the magazine and edited it. The publishing company struggled with the venture, however, and it was sold to local politician Ellen Melville after a few months and then to Vernon Dyson, whose wife Hedda Dyson took over the editorship.

== Later life and death ==
In 1968, Argall married William Glasgow in Auckland. She died in Auckland on 22 June 1981, and her body was cremated at Purewa Crematorium.
