= John Argall =

English cleric, logician and teacher

John Argall (1540 – 8 October 1606 ) was an English cleric, logician and teacher.

== Early life and education ==
Argall was born in 1540, the third son of Thomas Argall and Margaret Tallakarne, of London. Argall was admitted to Christ Church, Oxford, in the latter part of Queen Mary's reign; took the degree of B.A 22 October 1562 and M.A., 13 February 1565.

== Career ==
Afterwards he was presented to the living of Halesworth, in Suffolk. "He was always esteemed", says Anthony Wood, "a noted disputant during his stay in the university; was a great actor in plays at Christ Church (particularly when the queen was entertained there, 1566), and, when at ripe years, a tolerable theologist and preacher".

In 1568 Argall was appointed to the position of headmaster at Abingdon School and was given the use of one of St.John Almshouses on the new site of the School. He received 1s per week in addition to his stipend and also received £2 per annum from Christ's Hospital, making his salary up to £11 5s. 4d. He remained at the School for just three years leaving, in 1571.

He died suddenly at table on the occasion of a feast at Cheston, near Halesworth, and was buried in Halesworth Church on 8 October 1606.

== Works ==
Two tracts of Argall's are extant:

1. De vera Pœnitentia, London, 1604;
2. Introductio ad artem Dialecticam, London, 1605.
