= Chase Corporation =

Defunct New Zealand property development company

Chase Corporation was a property development company in New Zealand that flourished in the 1980s, became devalued in the 1987 New Zealand stock market collapse, and eventually collapsed in 1989.

== History ==
Chase Corp had a major effect on the New Zealand economy, starting out in the 1970s with small property developments, becoming an extremely large player in the New Zealand commercial property market in the 1980s. In the early 1980s, Chase Corp operated as a corporate raider, taking over companies whose shares they thought were under-priced, and then either 'asset stripping' or restructuring the company. Launching itself as a publicly listed company in April 1983, Chase Corp's share price rose to a high of $10.40 by June 1987, with an estimated value of NZ$3.6 billion. Chase Corp was one of the largest companies on the New Zealand share market. At the end of 1986 Chase Corporation was one of the largest three listed companies in New Zealand (along with Brierley Investments and Fletcher Challenge). Chase Corp also invested in Australia, England and the United States of America. After the New Zealand sharemarket crash on 20 October 1987, the Chase Corp share price continued to drop and it effectively never recovered from that point, as the New Zealand property market collapsed. On 4 July 1989, the NZ Government appointed statutory managers to run the NZ property interests of Chase Corp. The company was formally wound up in July 1996.

== Leadership ==
The Chairman of Chase Corp (as it was commonly known) was Colin Reynolds, with other Directors Peter Francis, Adrian Burr, John Clarke and Seph Glew. In April 1985, Colin Reynolds and Seph Glew featured on the cover of the magazine 'Metro' as the 'darlings of Queen Street'.
