= Milne & Choyce =

New Zealand department store chain

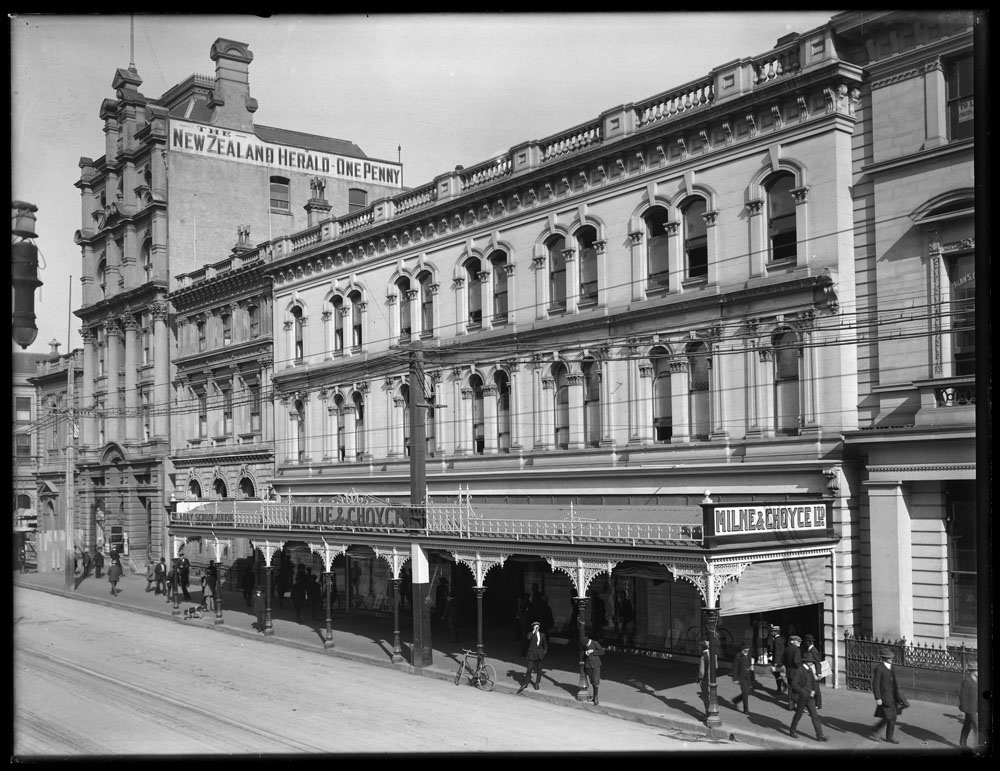
- The Milne & Choyce building on Queen Street, Auckland, in April 1913.
- Industry: Retail
- Genre: Department stores
- Founded: 1 July 1867; 159 years ago in Auckland, New Zealand
- Founder: Charlotte Milne; Mary Milne
- Defunct: 1992
- Headquarters: Auckland, New Zealand

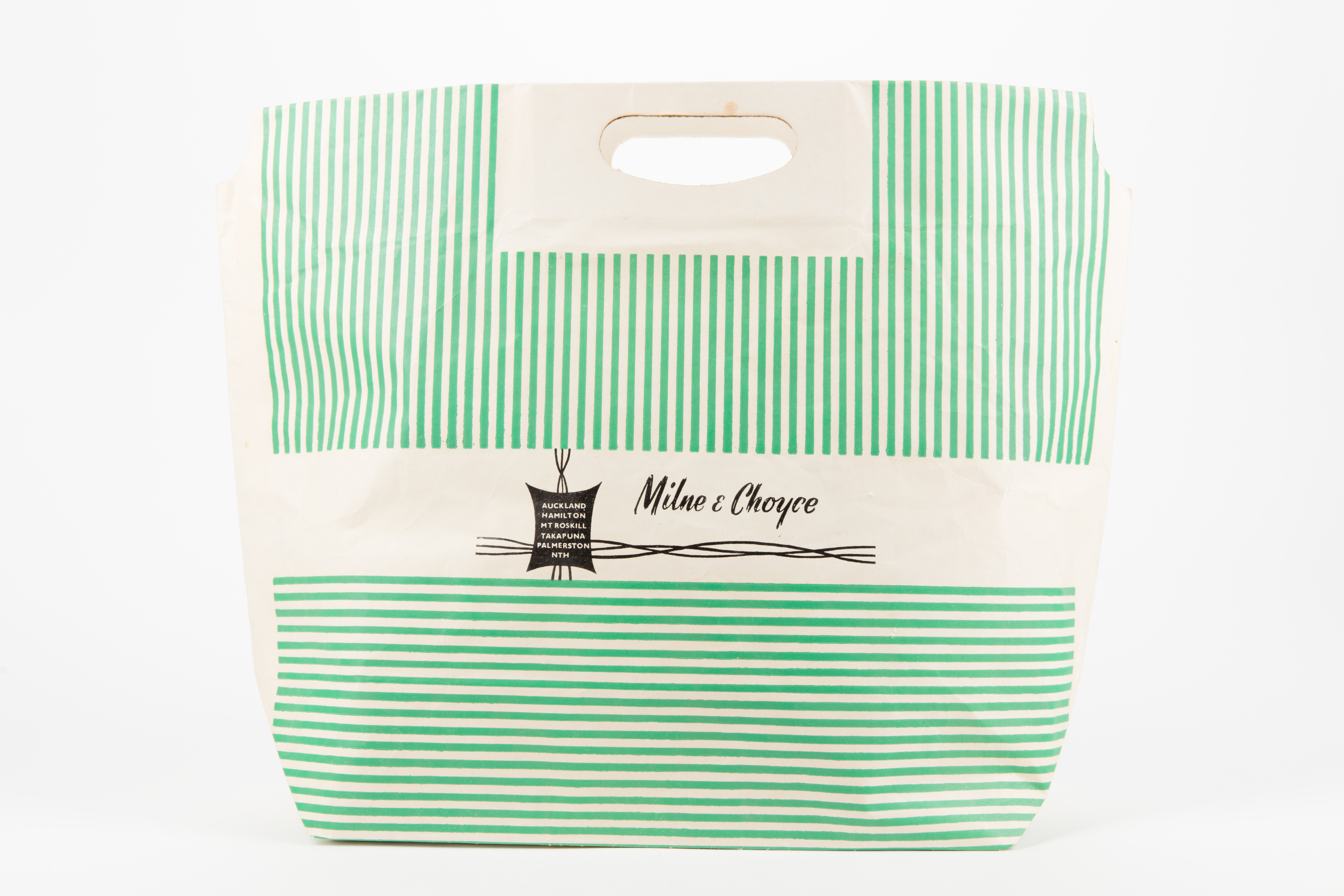
Milne & Choyce paper shopping bag displaying logo (circa 1960s).

Milne & Choyce, later trading as Milnes was a New Zealand luxury department store chain founded in 1867 and operating until at least 1992. At its peak, Milne & Choyce operated at least seven branch stores around the North Island of New Zealand, alongside a Queen Street flagship.

== History ==
On 3 July 1867, Mary Jane and Charlotte Milne took over the drapery shop of Mr and Mrs Wison at on the corner of Wyndham Street and Albert Street. The business was renamed Misses Milne.

In July 1874, the Misses Milne acquired the drapery shop of Mr. B. Cass within Cheapside House, on the corner of Queen Street and Wellesley Street. The original business on the corner of Wyndham Street and Albert Street continued to operate until operations were consolidated at Cheapside House in August. Sometime between this relocation and 1875, the business was renamed to M. & C. Milne.

In 1876, Charlotte Milne's husband Henry Charles Choyce took over her share in the company, and the business was renamed to Milne & Choyce. In September 1876, a fire occurred in the photography salon of John McGarrigle above Milne & Choyce's upstairs storeroom and destroyed much of the store's stock.

Milne & Choyce hosted a spring fashion parade in 1887, one of the first in Auckland.

In 1901, Milne & Choyce went public and became Milne & Choyce Ltd.; Henry Choyce served as managing director.

131 Queen Street was purchased in 1908 for £50,000. Milne & Choyce would now be situated "between the banks [Bank of New South Wales, Bank of New Zealand]". The company would relocate to the 131 Queen Street store on 6 September 1909.

Mary Jane Milne retired at the age of seventy in 1909, though she remained involved in the business until her death in 1921.

In 1923, the wooden premises were replaced with a nine-floor building (seven above ground), designed by Llewellyn Piper. The new store had six lifts, fire alarms, a private telephone exchange, and a workroom to produce custom-order garments and in-house labels.

Milne & Choyce purchased the Hooker & Kingston drapery of Hamilton in July 1950; it traded as Milne & Choyce from August 1950.

In January 1959, it was announced that Milne & Choyce and D.I.C. would now be associated for future merchandising and purchasing activities, to be coordinated through a shared buying office in Wellington. At the time Milne & Choyce had stores in Auckland (Central, Mount Roskill, Takapuna), Hamilton, and D.I.C. had stores in Christchurch, Dunedin, Lower Hutt, Wellington, and Whanganui.

The C.M. Ross & Co. department store of Palmerston North was purchased in September 1959 for £219,375. The store would be rebranded as Milne & Choyce and remain in operation until 1966. In 1966 the store was sold to D.I.C., in 1989 it was rebranded to Arthur Barnett. Arthur Barnett would close in 1992 and since 1996 the building has been home to the Palmerston North City Library.

In September 1960, a branch store opened in Takapuna.

In 1961, Milne & Choyce, Farmers, and Woolworths, entered into an agreement to purchase a plot of land in the Auckland suburb of New Lynn and develop New Zealand's first shopping centre. The shopping centre opened on 30 October 1963 as LynnMall.

In 1965, a branch store opened in Remuera. It was the largest suburban store of the company to date and featured a coffee bar that overlooked Hobson Bay alongside a self service food hall. One floor showed on Remuera Road but the store was actually three floors with a basement for storage and a rooftop carpark which could fit 60 cars. A Panmure branch store was opened around the same time.

In October 1971, a branch store opened at Māngere Town Centre. Milne & Choyce also purchased land in Howick for a new store.

In 1973, Fletcher purchased a 31.25% stake in the company. Also in 1973 rival department store George Court & Sons. and Atlas-Majestic Industries attempted take-over bids of Milne & Choyce.

On 28 February 1975, 131 Queen Street store closed and was relocated to the Downtown Shopping Centre. At this point, the company changed its name from Milne & Choyce to Milnes.

Fletcher attempted a take-over bid of Milnes in May 1975. In January 1976, Haywrights took over Milnes and stores were rebranded to Haywrights. In December 1976 four stores (Mount Roskill, Pakuranga, Northcote, and Papatoetoe) were sold.

The Haywrights Downtown Shopping Centre flagship store closed in August 1979 as the company exited the North Island and retreated back to the South Island.

Due to unknown circumstances the Milnes store in Remuera continued to operate following the Haywrights rebranding and North Island exit. The company was known as Milnes of Auckland/Milnes Group and had three stores around Auckland (Remuera, 151 Queen Street, and Glenn Innes).

In March 1989, Milnes entered receivership and began seeking a buyer in April. In May 1989, the Queen Street store (closed since April) began a receivership sale in attempts to save the Remuera store. The Remuera store was sold in late November 1989 and would continue trading as a speciality department store. Milnes Remuera continued trading until at least 1992.

=== 131 Queen Street ===
In 1975 the 131 Queen Street flagship relocated to the Downtown Shopping Centre. In 1986 the Centrecourt Shopping Centre opened in the building. Centrecourt closed circa 2020 and was replaced by offices and retail. In 2025, the building began renovations again, reopening as Faradays department store in September 2026.

== Store locations and opening timeline ==
Metropolitan area ("metro")	Suburb or Neighborhood	Name/Location/Notes	Size	Opened	Closed
Auckland	Auckland Central	Misses Milne Located at 37 Wyndham Street, corner of Albert Street.		3 July 1867	16 August 1874
Auckland	Auckland Central	Milne & Choyce Queen Street Located at Cheapside House, corner of Queen Street & Wellesley Street.		July 1874	1909
Auckland	Auckland Central	Milne & Choyce Queen Street Located at 131 Queen Street.		6 September 1909	1976
Hamilton	Hamilton Central	Milne & Choyce Hamilton Located at 231 Victoria Street.		21 August 1950	1976
Palmerston North	Palmerston North Central	Milne & Choyce Palmerston North Located at 4 The Square.		September 1959	1976
Auckland	Takapuna	Milne & Choyce Takapuna Located on Hurstmere Road.		12 September 1960	1976
Auckland	New Lynn	Milne & Choyce New Lynn Located at LynnMall.		30 October 1963	1976
Auckland	Remuera	Milne & Choyce Remuera Located on Remuera Road.		1965	1976
Auckland	Māngere	Milne & Choyce Mangere Located at Māngere Town Centre.	16,000 sq ft (1,486 m^{2})	12 October 1971	1976
Auckland	Remuera	Milnes of Remuera Located on Remuera Road.			~1992
Auckland	Auckland Central	Milnes Located at 151 Queen Street.			1989
