= Creative New Zealand =

New Zealand government agency

The Arts Council of New Zealand Toi Aotearoa (Creative New Zealand) is the national arts development agency of the New Zealand government established in 1994 to replace the Queen Elizabeth II Arts Council. It invests in artists and arts organisations, offering capability building programmes and developing markets and audiences for New Zealand arts domestically and internationally.

== History ==
=== Queen Elizabeth II Arts Council ===
The Queen Elizabeth II Arts Council was an arts trust established in 1963 as a national gift to commemorate Queen Elizabeth II's visit to New Zealand. Elizabeth expressed a preference that gifts to her should be given to the community as scholarships, endowments, or trusts in her name. The Holyoake government accordingly set up the Queen Elizabeth II Arts Council as a statutory and independent body to foster the development of arts in New Zealand, financed by the government with contributions from organisations and individuals. A resolution to establish the council passed unanimously on 12 February 1963, and Minister of Internal Affairs David Seath announced the council as active on 3 April 1964. The council replaced the superseded Arts Advisory Council and differed from the previous body in that it was an independent statutory body not entirely dependent on government funding. Prior to that in the 1940s because of centennial celebrations the government set up a cultural office within the Department of Internal Affairs, the New Zealand Film Unit and a national orchestra. A literary fund was also established.

The Māori and South Pacific Arts Council (MASPAC) was part of the Queen Elizabeth II Arts Council. They were set up in 1978 to 'encourage, promote and develop the practice and appreciation of the arts and crafts of the Māori and South Pacific people in New Zealand.' One of the things they did in the early 1980s was acknowledge weaving as an artform which had been a desire of Ngoi Pēwhairangi. In 1983 MASPAC awarded funding to Misa Emma Kesha to establish the Dunedin Multicultural Weavers Association so cultures could exchange their artforms and Indigenous stories, and in the same year Emily Schuster became the convener of a steering committee to look at the needs of weavers around New Zealand.

In 1993 the Arts Council restructured with separate general and Māori arts boards.

=== Creative New Zealand ===
On 29 June 1994, the Bolger Government passed the Arts Council of New Zealand Toi Aotearoa Act to establish the Arts Council of New Zealand Toi Aotearoa as a national body for the arts to replace the Queen Elizabeth II Arts Council. The council came into force on 1 July. The Arts Council was restructured and relaunched as Creative New Zealand in June, 1995.

In 2012, Creative New Zealand introduced Toi Uru Kahikatea Arts Development and Toi Tōtara Haemata Leadership Investments to replace the Recurrently Funded Organisations funding. Arts Development Investments provide funding for three years for established artists, arts practitioners, groups and arts organisations.

In mid-July 2026, Creative New Zealand confirmed that it would reduce staff numbers by a third from 84 to 55 roles as part of a restructuring process. The Public Service Association's national secretary Fleur Fitzsimons described the job cuts as "cultural vandalism."

== Funding ==
Since the 1980s Creative New Zealand's funding came also from the Lottery Grants Board (now the Lotto New Zealand).

In 2006/2007 Creative New Zealand received NZ$15.45 million in base funding.

Since the majority of Creative New Zealand's income is from Lotto it fluctuates dependent on numbers of lotto and instant kiwi tickets sold. In 2011/2012 Creative New Zealand received NZ$27.5 million of lottery funding and with NZ$15.7 million from the Arts Culture and Heritage budget.

Between 2010 and 2019 Creative New Zealand's crown funding was static with NZ$15.89 million annually. In the 2014/2015 the breakdown was approximately 30% central government funding and the remaining from Lotto. In 2015/2016 there was NZ$30 million in Lotto funds, in 2018/2019 it was NZ$39 million in Lotto funds and in 2019/2022 it was NZ$47 million.

In the 2022 budget Creative New Zealand received NZ$16.68 million baseline funding. Crown funding for the arts through Creative New Zealand has not expanded with population growth of almost 1 million people between 2006 and 2022.

Approximately 55% of funds is allocated to Toi Uru Kahikatea Arts Development and Toi Tōtara Haemata Leadership Investments. In the 2023 - 2025 cycle this is a total of NZ$104 million over three-years between 81 organisations, with all also sourcing income from other places.

Funding is available for artists, community groups and arts organisations. Creative New Zealand funds projects and organisations across many art-forms, including theatre, dance, music, literature, visual art, craft object art, Māori arts, Pacific arts, Inter-arts and Multi-disciplinary.

Creative New Zealand funding is distributed under four programmes:

- Investment programmes
- Grants and special opportunities
- Creative Communities Scheme
- International programme

Creative New Zealand funds Toi Ake that seeks to protect, develop and retain the heritage of Māori arts / ngā toi Māori.

In 2026, a new deal between government of Niue and Creative New Zealand, extends artists residencies in Niue to 2028. Giving Pacific artists a chance to experience six weeks in Niue, to freely connecting to local artists, running workshops, and art making.

== Governance structure and legislation ==
The Arts Council of New Zealand Toi Aotearoa is the governing board of Creative New Zealand. In the 2015 report the Council consisted of 13 members. Creative New Zealand is a crown entity and works within a legislative framework formed by the Arts Council of New Zealand Toi Aotearoa Act 2014 and the Crown Entities Act 2004.

== See also ==
- Arts Pasifika Awards
- Te Waka Toi Awards
- Prime Minister's Awards for literary achievement
- Matafetu Smith
