= Results of the 2025 New Zealand territorial authority elections in Otago =

2025 New Zealand territorial authority elections (Otago)
- 11 October 2025
- Turnout: 81,370 (47.18% ▼1.92 pp)
- 5 of 5 local councils
Party	Councils	+/–
No majority	5	0
This lists parties that won seats. See the complete results below.
- 5 mayors and 54 local councillors
Party	Seats	+/–
Mayors
Independent	5	+1
Local councillors
Independent	50	−4
Future Dunedin	1	+1
Building Kotahitaka	1	+1
Labour	1	0
Green	1	+1
This lists parties that won seats. See the complete results below.

Elections for the territorial authorities of New Zealand were held from 9 September until 11 October 2025 as part of that year's nation-wide local elections. 709 local councillors and 66 mayors were elected across 66 of 67 councils.

5 territorial authorities are primarily located in the Otago Region. 5 mayors and 54 district and city councillors were elected. 1 of 5 mayors were re-elected and no group gained or held a majority on any council.

== Maps ==

Legend
Independent hold	Independent gain
	Future Dunedin gain
	Building Kotahitaka gain
Labour hold	
	Green gain

== Summary ==
=== Overall ===
Council	Electoral system	Seats	Mayor	Councillors	Control	Turnout	Details	Refs
Waitaki	FPP	10	▌ Independent gain	▌ Independent 10 ( 0)	▌ No majority	28,593; 52.52% ▲2.35 pp	Details	
Central Otago	FPP	10	▌ Independent hold	▌ Independent 10 (▼1)	▌ No majority	9,939; 55.47% ▲7.35 pp	Details	
Queenstown Lakes	FPP	11	▌ Independent gain	▌ Independent 11 ( 0)	▌ No majority	12,927; 41.54% ▼2.93 pp	Details	
Dunedin	STV	14	▌ Independent gain	▌ Independent 10 ( 0) ▌ Future Dunedin 1 (▲1) ▌ Building Kotahitaka 1 (▲1) ▌ Labour 1 (▲1) ▌ Green 1 (▲1)	▌ No majority	43,300; 45.72% ▼4.18 pp	Details	
Clutha	FPP	9	▌ Independent gain	▌ Independent 9 (▼3)	▌ No majority	6,614; 53.45% ▲0.35 pp	Details	
5 of 5 councils		54						

=== Mayors ===
Council	Incumbent	Elected	Runner-up	Details	Refs
Waitaki	Gary Kircher^{R} (Ind)	Melanie Tavendale (Ind)	David Wilson (Ind)	Details	
Central Otago	Tamah Alley (Ind)		Charlie Sanders (Ind)	Details	
Queenstown Lakes	Glyn Lewers (Ind)	John Glover (Ind)	Glyn Lewers (Ind)	Details	
Dunedin	Jules Radich (TD)	Sophie Barker (Ind)	Andrew Simms (FD)	Details	
Clutha	Bryan Cadogan^{R} (Ind)	Jock Martin (Ind)	Ken Payne (Ind)	Details	
^{R} did not run for re-election

=== Candidates ===
Party / ticket	Mayors				Councillors			
Party / ticket	2022	Candidates	Elected	+/−	2022	Candidates	Elected	+/−
Independent	4	24	5	▲1	54	85	50	▼4
Building Kotahitaka	(new)	1	0	0	(new)	3	1	▲1
Future Dunedin	(new)	1	0	0	(new)	9	1	▲1
Green	0	1	0	0	0	3	1	▲1
Labour	no candidates				1	2	1	0
Radical Action	(new)	1	0	0	(new)	1	0	0
Silly Hat	(new)	1	0	0	no candidates			
Change for Central	no candidates				(new)	2	0	0
ACT Local	no candidates				(new)	1	0	0
Team Dunedin	1	0	0	▼1	3	0	0	▼3
Residents and Ratepayers	no candidates				1	0	0	▼1
Seats:	5		5	0	59		54	▼5

== Waitaki District Council ==
2025 Waitaki District Council election
- 11 October 2025
- Turnout: 8,593 (52.52% ▲2.35 pp)
- Mayor
	Ind	Ind	Ind
Candidate	Melanie Tavendale	David Wilson	Guy Percival
Party	Independent	Independent	Independent
Popular vote	3,811	2,148	1,775
Percentage	44.35%	24.99%	20.66%
Mayor before election
Gary Kircher
Independent
Elected mayor
Melanie Tavendale
Independent
- Councillors
- 10 seats on the governing body of Waitaki District Council; 6 seats needed for a majority
Party	Seats	+/–
Independent	10	0
This lists parties that won seats. See the complete results below.

=== 2025 Waitaki mayoral election ===
2025 Waitaki mayoral election
Party	Candidate	Votes	%	±%
Independent	Melanie Tavendale	3,811	44.35	(new)
Independent	David Wilson	2,148	25.00	(new)
Independent	Guy Percival	1,775	20.66	(new)
Independent	Kelli Williams	784	9.12	(new)
Informal votes		16	0.19	+0.18
Blank votes		59	0.69	−4.20
Turnout		8,593	52.52	+2.35
Registered electors		16,361		
Independent gain from Independent				

=== Ahuriri ward ===
2025 Ahuriri ward election
Party	Candidate	Votes	%	±%
Independent	Brent Cowles^{†}	elected unopposed		
Registered electors		1,230		
Independent hold				
^{†} incumbent

=== Ōamaru ward ===
2025 Ōamaru ward election
Party	Candidate	Votes	%	±%
Independent	Rebecca Ryan^{†}	2,993	54.26	−3.75
Independent	Courtney Linwood^{†}	2,934	53.19	+8.45
Independent	Jeremy Holding^{†}	2,832	51.34	+5.07
Independent	Jim Hopkins^{†}	2,716	49.24	−7.04
Independent	Dan Lewis	2,503	45.38	+7.27
Independent	Mata'aga Hana Melania Fanene-Taiti	2,284	41.41	(new)
Independent	Peter De Reus	2,159	39.14	(new)
Independent	Richard Vinbrux	1,639	29.71	(new)
Independent	Mark Townsend	1,606	29.12	(new)
Independent	Sheridan Newson	1,192	21.61	(new)
Independent	Nathan Barnes	1,063	19.27	(new)
Independent	Andy De Boer	1,057	19.16	(new)
Independent	Ferdie Kruger	1,001	18.15	(new)
Independent	Ramon Kirk	520	9.43	(new)
Independent	Teenica (Teeni) Harrex	513	9.30	(new)
Informal votes		11	0.20	−0.08
Blank votes		80	1.45	+0.24
Turnout		5,516	53.45	+2.60
Registered electors		10,320		
Independent hold				
Independent hold				
Independent hold				
Independent hold				
Independent gain from Independent				
Independent gain from Independent				
^{†} incumbent

=== Waihemo ward ===
2025 Waihemo ward election
Party	Candidate	Votes	%	±%
Independent	Frans Schlack	432	48.21	(new)
Independent	Garry Dodd	256	28.57	(new)
Independent	Gervais 'G' O'Reilly	153	17.08	−7.67
Informal votes		2	0.22	+0.22
Blank votes		53	5.92	+2.04
Turnout		896	50.08	−1.06
Registered electors		1,789		
Independent gain from Independent				

=== Corriedale ward ===
2025 Corriedale ward election
Party	Candidate	Votes	%	±%
Independent	John McCone^{†}	elected unopposed		
Independent	Sven Thelning	elected unopposed		
Registered electors		3,022		
Independent hold				
Independent gain from Independent				
^{†} incumbent

== Central Otago District Council ==
2025 Central Otago District Council election
- 11 October 2025
- Turnout: 9,939 (55.47% ▲7.35 pp)
- Mayor
	Ind	Ind	Ind
Candidate	Tamah Alley	Charlie Sanders	Mark Quinn
Party	Independent	Independent	Independent
Popular vote	5,990	2,225	1,542
Percentage	60.29%	22.39%	15.52%
Mayor before election
Tamah Alley
Independent
Elected mayor
Tamah Alley
Independent
- Councillors
- 10 seats on the governing body of Central Otago District Council; 6 seats needed for a majority
Party	Seats	+/–
Independent	10	−1
This lists parties that won seats. See the complete results below.

=== 2025 Central Otago mayoral election ===
2025 Central Otago mayoral election>
Party	Candidate	Votes	%	±%
Independent	Tamah Alley^{†}	5,990	60.29	(new)
Independent	Charlie Sanders	2,225	22.39	(new)
Independent	Mark Quinn	1,542	15.52	(new)
Informal votes		15	0.15	n/a
Blank votes		164	1.65	n/a
Turnout		9,936	55.47	n/a
Registered electors		17,912		
Independent hold				
^{†} incumbent

=== Cromwell ward ===
2025 Cromwell ward election
Party	Candidate	Votes	%	±%
Independent	Cheryl Laws^{†}	2,050	57.21	−6.14
Independent	Sarah Browne^{†}	2,021	56.41	−10.98
Independent	Charlie Sanders	1,602	44.71	(new)
Independent	Bob Scott	1,486	41.47	+22.60
Independent	Andrew Burns	1,339	37.37	(new)
Change for Central	Stephen Carruth	1,124	31.37	(new)
Independent	Gareth Noble	1,085	30.28	(new)
Independent	Terry Davis	807	22.52	(new)
Independent	Dave George	418	11.67	(new)
Informal votes		2	0.06	−0.05
Blank votes		38	1.06	+0.78
Turnout		3,583	51.23	+8.21
Registered electors		6,994		
Independent hold				
Independent hold				
Independent gain from Independent				
Independent gain from Independent				
^{†} incumbent

=== Vincent ward ===
2025 Vincent ward election
Party	Candidate	Votes	%	±%
Independent	Tracy Paterson^{†}	2,445	53.29	−12.68
Independent	Martin McPherson^{†}	1,889	41.17	−12.27
Independent	Nathan McLean	1,826	39.80	(new)
Independent	Dave McKenzie	1,608	35.05	(new)
Independent	Louise Van Der Voort	1,575	34.33	(new)
Independent	Ian Cooney^{†}	1,491	32.50	−12.67
Independent	Jayden Cromb	1,420	30.95	−0.96
Independent	Lynley Claridge^{†}	1,335	29.10	−22.49
Independent	Gill Booth	870	18.96	(new)
Change for Central	Cam Withington	791	17.24	(new)
Independent	Kas McEntyre	468	10.20	(new)
Informal votes		6	0.13	+0.11
Blank votes		74	1.61	+0.51
Turnout		4,588	55.65	+4.44
Registered electors		8,244		
Independent hold				
Independent hold				
Independent gain from Independent				
Independent gain from Independent				
^{†} incumbent

=== Maniototo ward ===
2025 Maniototo ward election
Party	Candidate	Votes	%	±%
Independent	Stu Duncan^{†}	580	61.12	n/a
Independent	Michelle Bisset	361	38.04	(new)
Informal votes		2	0.21	n/a
Blank votes		6	0.63	n/a
Turnout		949	68.27	n/a
Registered electors		1,390		
Independent hold				
^{†} incumbent

=== Teviot Valley ward ===
2025 Teviot Valley ward election
Party	Candidate	Votes	%	±%
Independent	Curtis Pannett	698	85.54	(new)
Independent	Mark Quinn	104	12.75	(new)
Informal votes		1	0.12	+0.12
Blank votes		13	1.59	−1.80
Turnout		816	63.55	+8.66
Registered electors		1,284		
Independent gain from Independent				

== Queenstown Lakes District Council ==
2025 Queenstown Lakes District Council election
- 11 October 2025
- Turnout: 12,927 (41.54% ▼2.93 pp)
- Mayor
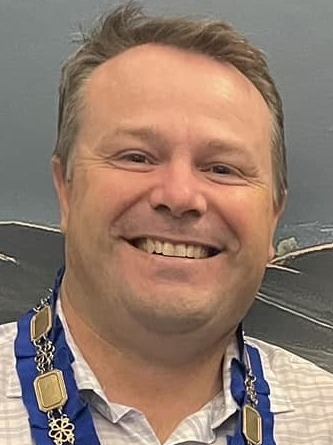
	Ind
Candidate	John Glover	Glyn Lewers
Party	Independent	Independent
Popular vote	4,599	3,244
Percentage	35.58%	25.09%
	Ind	Ind
Candidate	Nik Kiddle	Darren Rewi
Party	Independent	Independent
Popular vote	2,108	1,671
Percentage	16.31%	12.93%
Mayor before election
Glyn Lewers
Independent
Elected mayor
John Glover
Independent
- Councillors
- 11 seats on the governing body of Queenstown Lakes District Council; 6 seats needed for a majority
Party	Seats	+/–
Independent	11	0
This lists parties that won seats. See the complete results below.

=== 2025 Queenstown Lakes mayoral election ===
2025 Queenstown Lakes mayoral election
Party	Candidate	Votes	%	±%
Independent	John Glover	4,599	35.58	(new)
Independent	Glyn Lewers^{†}	3,244	25.09	−9.99
Independent	Nik Kiddle	2,108	16.31	(new)
Independent	Darren Rewi	1,671	12.93	(new)
Independent	Al Angus	874	6.76	+0.19
Independent	Daniel Shand	125	0.97	−0.64
Informal votes		36	0.28	+0.04
Blank votes		270	2.09	−0.33
Turnout		12,927	41.54	−2.93
Registered electors		31,118		
Independent gain from Independent				
^{†} incumbent

=== Queenstown-Whakatipu ward ===
2025 Queenstown-Whakatipu ward election
Party	Candidate	Votes	%	±%
Independent	Matt Wong^{†}	2,287	61.89	−2.34
Independent	Gavin Bartlett^{†}	2,002	54.18	+7.34
Independent	Stephen Brent	1,924	52.07	(new)
Independent	Jon Mitchell	1,689	45.71	(new)
Independent	Craig 'Ferg' Ferguson	1,648	44.60	(new)
Independent	Aaron Cowie	1,349	36.51	(new)
Independent	Rene Smith	904	24.47	(new)
Informal votes		4	0.11	+0.03
Blank votes		55	1.49	−4.11
Turnout		3,695	35.36	−4.81
Registered electors		10,451		
Independent hold				
Independent hold				
Independent gain from Independent				
Independent gain from Independent				
^{†} incumbent

=== Wānaka-Upper Clutha ward ===
2025 Wānaka-Upper Clutha ward election
Party	Candidate	Votes	%	±%
Independent	Nicola King	3,610	63.22	(new)
Independent	Quentin Smith^{†}	3,394	59.44	−10.73
Independent	Niki Gladding	2,863	50.14	(new)
Independent	Cody Tucker^{†}	2,039	35.71	−10.69
Independent	Craig Gasson	2,005	35.11	(new)
Independent	Yeverley McCarthy	2,005	35.11	−1.69
Independent	Lyal Cocks	1,667	29.19	(new)
Independent	Barry Bruce^{†}	1,241	21.73	−30.33
Independent	Thorsk G Westphal	1,083	18.97	(new)
Informal votes		15	0.26	+0.22
Blank votes		28	0.49	−0.69
Turnout		5,710	46.72	+0.47
Registered electors		12,223		
Independent gain from Independent				
Independent hold				
Independent gain from Independent				
Independent hold				
^{†} incumbent

=== Arrowtown-Kawarau ward ===
2025 Arrowtown-Kawarau ward election
Party	Candidate	Votes	%	±%
Independent	Heath Copland	1,927	54.71	(new)
Independent	Melissa White	1,730	49.12	+20.26
Independent	Q (Samuel) Belk	1,703	48.35	(new)
Independent	Lisa Guy^{†}	1,518	43.10	−7.43
Independent	Tim Manning	1,448	41.11	(new)
Informal votes		7	0.20	+0.15
Blank votes		117	3.32	−0.42
Turnout		3,522	41.71	−5.19
Registered electors		8,444		
Independent gain from Independent				
Independent gain from Independent				
Independent gain from Independent				
^{†} incumbent

== Dunedin City Council ==
2025 Dunedin City Council election
- 11 October 2025
- Turnout: 43,300 (45.72% ▼4.18 pp)
- Mayor
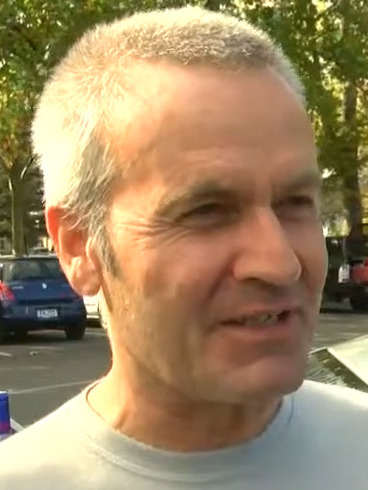

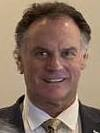

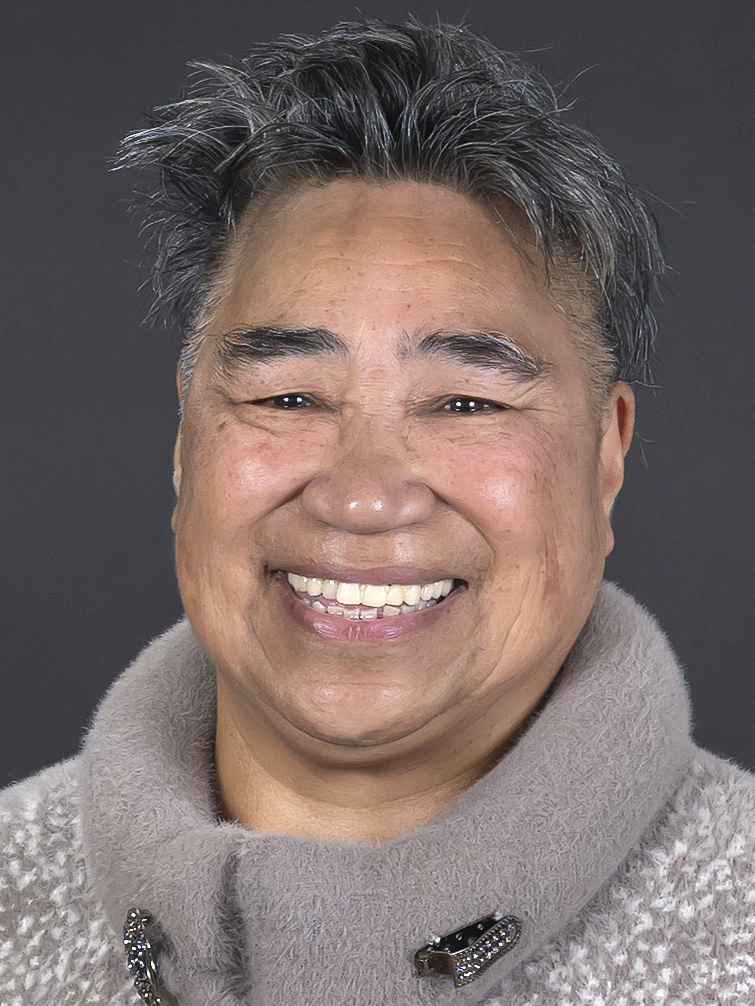
	Ind		Ind
Candidate	Sophie Barker	Andrew Simms	Lee Vandervis
Party	Independent	Future Dunedin	Independent
Primary vote	10,382	11,377	7,234
Percentage	23.98%	26.28%	16.71%
Final vote	16,874	15,976	excluded
Percentage	51.37%	48.63%
Candidate	Jules Radich	Marie Laufiso
Party	Independent	Building Kotahitaka
Primary vote	3,485	2,437
Percentage	8.05%	5.63%
Final vote	excluded	excluded
Mayor before election
Jules Radich
Team Dunedin
Elected mayor
Sophie Barker
Independent
- Councillors
- 14 seats on the governing body of Dunedin City Council; 8 seats needed for a majority
Party	Seats	+/–
Independent	10	0
Future Dunedin	1	+1
Building Kotahitaka	1	+1
Green	1	+1
Labour	1	0
This lists parties that won seats. See the complete results below.

=== 2025 Dunedin mayoral election ===
2025 Dunedin mayoral election
Party	Candidate	Primary votes	%	±%	Iteration	
Party	Candidate	Primary votes	%	±%	#	Votes
Independent	Sophie Barker	10,382	23.98	+8.72	15th	16,874
Future Dunedin	Andrew Simms	11,377	26.27	(new)	15th	15,976
Independent	Lee Vandervis	7,234	16.71	+4.29	14th	8,739
Independent	Jules Radich^{†}	3,485	8.05	−27.65	13th	4,174
Building Kotahitaka	Marie Laufiso	2,437	5.63	(new)	12th	4,001
Green	Mickey Treadwell	1,967	4.54	(new)	11th	2,491
Independent	Mandy Mayhem	1,259	2.91	+0.66	10th	1,480
Independent	Benedict Ong	947	2.19	(new)	9th	1,248
Independent	Carmen Houlahan	758	1.75	−1.54	8th	1,017
Independent	Doug Hall	675	1.56	(new)	7th	797
Independent	Lync Aronson	657	1.52	(new)	6th	739
Independent	Lianna MacFarlane	422	0.97	(new)	5th	497
Independent	David Milne	344	0.79	−1.47	4th	360
Radical Action	Ruthven Allimrac	296	0.68	(new)	3rd	314
Independent	Pamela Taylor	149	0.34	−0.35	2nd	149
Silly Hat	Flynn (Nisvett) Nisbett	73	0.17	(new)	1st	73
Quota		21,231	49.03	−0.12		
Informal votes		106	0.24	+0.02		
Blank votes		727	1.68	+0.85		
Turnout		43,300	45.72	−4.18		
Registered electors		94,717				
Independent gain from Team Dunedin on 15th iteration						
^{†} incumbent

=== Dunedin at-large ===
2025 Dunedin at-large election
Party	Candidate	Primary votes	%	±%	Iteration	
Party	Candidate	Primary votes	%	±%	#	Votes
Future Dunedin	Andrew Simms	7,540	17.41	(new)	1st	7,540
Independent	Lee Vandervis^{†}	6,461	14.92	+1.68	1st	6,461
Independent	Jules Radich	2,102	4.85	+4.85	2nd	2,916
Building Kotahitaka	Marie Laufiso^{†}	2,410	5.57	−1.62	47th	2,785
Independent	John Chambers	1,665	3.85	(new)	65th	2,770
Independent	Russell Lund	1,051	2.43	(new)	69th	2,733
Independent	Brent Weatherall^{†}	941	2.17	−5.76	74th	2,664
Labour	Steve Walker^{†}	1,618	3.74	−0.21	76th	2,670
Independent	Cherry Lucas^{†}	1,320	3.05	+1.10	76th	2,656
Green	Mickey Treadwell	1,299	3.00	(new)	77th	2,658
Independent	Mandy Mayhem^{†}	1,356	3.13	+0.48	81st	2,651
Independent	Benedict Ong	891	2.06	(new)	81st	2,596
Independent	Christine Garey^{†}	1,236	2.85	−1.03	84th	2,592
Independent	Doug Hall	686	1.58	+0.47	87th	2,577
Future Dunedin	Bruce Ranga	443	1.02	(new)	87th	2,372
Independent	Andrew Whiley^{†}	691	1.60	−4.80	78th	1,739
Independent	Carmen Houlahan^{†}	605	1.40	−1.62	75th	1,563
Future Dunedin	Conrad Stedman	417	0.96	(new)	71st	1,438
Independent	Bill Acklin^{†}	607	1.40	−1.80	68th	1,270
Future Dunedin	Rachel Brazil	562	1.30	(new)	66th	1,174
Independent	Lync Aronson	578	1.33	(new)	64th	1,025
Green	Rose Finnie	449	1.04	(new)	62nd	914
Future Dunedin	Jo Galer	406	0.94	(new)	60th	876
Future Dunedin	Rebecca (Bex) Twemlow	346	0.80	(new)	58th	813
Independent	Paul Pope	558	1.29	(new)	56th	781
Independent	Jim O'Malley^{†}	530	1.22	−1.66	54th	726
Independent	Lianna MacFarlane	322	0.74	(new)	52nd	644
Green	Lily Warring	468	1.08	(new)	50th	613
Future Dunedin	Andrew Sutton	236	0.55	(new)	48th	570
Independent	Richard Knights	415	0.96	−0.10	46th	537
Future Dunedin	Jarrod Hodson	283	0.65	(new)	44th	509
ACT Local	Anthony Kenny	273	0.63	(new)	42nd	468
Independent	Sarah Davie-Nitis	296	0.68	(new)	40th	451
Independent	Kevin Gilbert^{†}	292	0.67	−1.14	38th	429
Labour	Jett Groshinski	332	0.77	−0.35	36th	402
Independent	Hugh O'Neill	160	0.37	(new)	34th	311
Independent	David Milne	184	0.42	(new)	33rd	305
Independent	Tony Bennett	218	0.50	(new)	30th	298
Independent	Heike Cebulla-Elder	243	0.56	(new)	27th	281
Independent	Paul Williams	227	0.52	(new)	25th	278
Independent	Sue Todd	155	0.36	(new)	22nd	267
Independent	Robert Hamlin	162	0.37	(new)	20th	259
Independent	Lachlan Akers	207	0.48	(new)	18th	234
Independent	Pamela Taylor	116	0.27	−0.22	16th	231
Future Dunedin	Amy Taylor	131	0.30	(new)	14th	210
Radical Action	Jen Olsen	172	0.40	(new)	13th	187
Independent	Daniel Rooney	164	0.38	(new)	12th	184
Building Kotahitaka	Anna Knight	108	0.25	(new)	11th	115
Independent	Evelyn Robertson	72	0.17	(new)	10th	78
Independent	Marian Poole	63	0.15	(new)	9th	68
Building Kotahitaka	Cyndee Elder	60	0.14	(new)	8th	67
Independent	Marita Johnson	47	0.11	−0.05	5th	53
Independent	Karla Hart	14	0.03	(new)	4th	19
Independent	Sophie Barker^{†} (withdrawn, elected mayor)	n/a	n/a	n/a	1st	0
Quota		2,813	6.50	+0.18		
Informal votes		579	1.34	−0.66		
Blank votes		423	0.98	−0.81		
Turnout		43,300	45.72	−4.18		
Registered electors		94,717				
Future Dunedin gain from Independent on 1st iteration						
Independent hold on 1st iteration						
Independent gain from Independent on 2nd iteration						
Building Kotahitaka gain from Independent on 47th iteration						
Independent gain from Independent on 65th iteration						
Independent gain from Independent on 69th iteration						
Independent hold on 74th iteration						
Labour hold on 76th iteration						
Independent hold on 76th iteration						
Green gain from Independent on 77th iteration						
Independent hold on 81st iteration						
Independent gain from Team Dunedin on 81st iteration						
Independent gain from Team Dunedin on 84th iteration						
Independent gain from Team Dunedin on 87th iteration						
^{†} incumbent

== Clutha District Council ==
2025 Clutha District Council election
- 11 October 2025
- Turnout: 6,614 (53.45% ▲0.35 pp)
- Mayor
	Ind	Ind
Candidate	Jock Martin	Ken Payne
Party	Independent	Independent
Popular vote	4,196	2,331
Percentage	63.44%	35.24%
Mayor before election
Bryan Cadogan
Independent
Elected mayor
Jock Martin
Independent
- Councillors
- 9 seats on the governing body of Central Otago District Council; 5 seats needed for a majority
Party	Seats	+/–
Independent	9	−4
This lists parties that won seats. See the complete results below.

=== 2025 Clutha mayoral election ===
2025 Clutha mayoral election
Party	Candidate	Votes	%	±%
Independent	Jock Martin	4,196	63.44	(new)
Independent	Ken Payne	2,331	35.24	(new)
Informal votes		10	0.15	+0.06
Blank votes		77	1.16	−0.77
Turnout		6,614	53.45	+0.35
Registered electors		12,375		
Independent gain from Independent				

=== Balclutha ward ===
2025 Balclutha ward election
Party	Candidate	Votes	%	±%
Independent	Brendon Smith	830	52.90	(new)
Independent	Rachel Joanne Harrison	606	38.62	(new)
Independent	Ruth Baldwin	596	37.99	(new)
Independent	Phil Barrett	536	34.16	(new)
Independent	Wayne Felts^{†}	365	23.26	−17.90
Informal votes		7	0.45	+0.20
Blank votes		17	1.08	−1.62
Turnout		1,569	51.92	−1.38
Registered electors		3,022		
Independent gain from Independent				
Independent gain from Independent				
^{†} incumbent

=== Bruce-Waihola ward ===
2025 Bruce-Waihola ward election
Party	Candidate	Votes	%	±%
Independent	Dean McCrostie	314	50.89	(new)
Independent	Gaynor Finch	297	48.14	(new)
Informal votes		1	0.16	n/a
Blank votes		5	0.81	n/a
Turnout		617	47.32	n/a
Registered electors		1,304		
Independent win (new seat)				

=== Catlins ward ===
2025 Catlins ward election
Party	Candidate	Votes	%	±%
Independent	Dane Joel Catherwood^{†}	elected unopposed		
Registered electors		1,288		
Independent hold				
^{†} incumbent

=== Clinton-Clydevale ward ===
2025 Clinton-Clydevale ward election
Party	Candidate	Votes	%	±%
Independent	Simon McAtamney	340	52.15	(new)
Independent	Therron Tapp	162	24.85	(new)
Independent	Joanne Janetta Thomson	143	21.93	(new)
Informal votes		1	0.15	n/a
Blank votes		6	0.92	n/a
Turnout		652	56.65	n/a
Registered electors		1,151		
Independent win (new seat)				

=== Kaitangata-Matau ward ===
2025 Kaitangata-Matau ward election
Party	Candidate	Votes	%	±%
Independent	Bruce Roger Graham	elected unopposed		
Registered electors		1,288		
Independent win (new seat)				

=== Lawrence-Tuapeka ward ===
2025 Lawrence-Tuapeka ward election
Party	Candidate	Votes	%	±%
Independent	Roger James Cotton	609	66.85	(new)
Independent	Anne Wai Chin Cheng	289	31.72	(new)
Informal votes		0	0.00	n/a
Blank votes		13	1.43	n/a
Turnout		911	66.45	n/a
Registered electors		1,371		
Independent win (new seat)				

=== Milton ward ===
2025 Milton ward election
Party	Candidate	Votes	%	±%
Independent	Larry Frost	170	23.64	(new)
Independent	Mark William Soper	148	20.58	(new)
Independent	Ricky Boulton	142	19.75	(new)
Independent	Chris McDonald	133	18.50	(new)
Independent	Nanetta Maria Knowles	93	12.93	(new)
Independent	Douglas John Keen	25	3.48	(new)
Informal votes		7	0.97	n/a
Blank votes		1	0.14	n/a
Turnout		719	51.58	n/a
Registered electors		1,394		
Independent win (new seat)				

=== West Otago ward ===
2025 West Otago ward election
Party	Candidate	Votes	%	±%
Independent	Michelle Kennedy^{†}	elected unopposed		
Registered electors		1,424		
Independent hold				
^{†} incumbent

== See also ==
- 2025 Otago Regional Council election
