= 2022 Dunedin mayoral election =

Local election in New Zealand

- 8 October 2022
- Turnout: 47,417
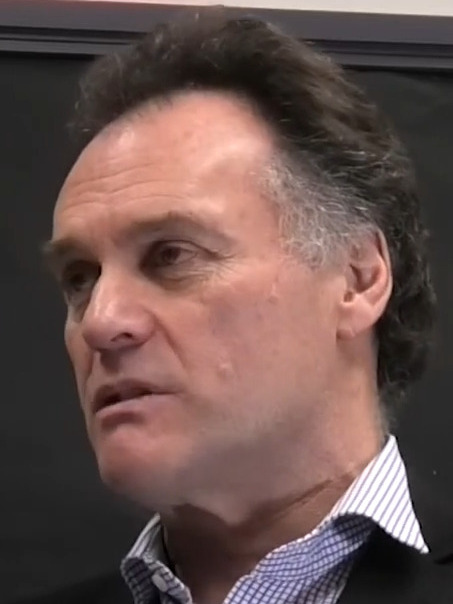

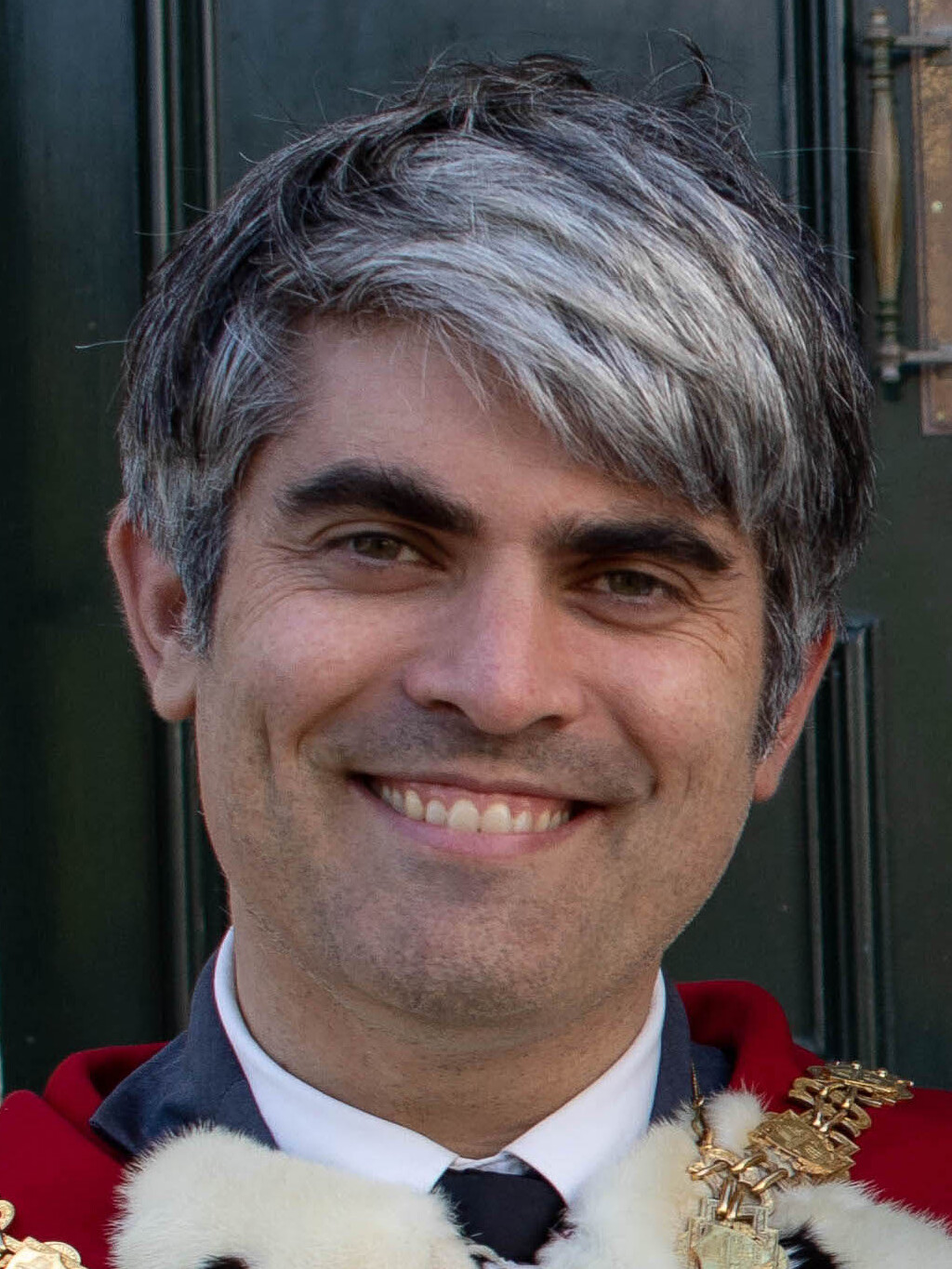

| Candidate | Jules Radich | Aaron Hawkins | Sophie Barker |
| Party | Team Dunedin | Green Ōtepoti | Independent |
| Primary vote | 17,184 | 10,445 | 7,345 |
| Percentage | 36.32% | 22.08% | 15.52% |
| Final count | 21,286 | 11,388 | 9,574 |
| Percentage | 50.38% | 26.96% | 22.66% |
Mayor before election
Aaron Hawkins
Elected mayor
Jules Radich

The 2022 Dunedin mayoral election between 16 September and 8 October 2022 was part of the 2022 New Zealand local elections. Voters preferred former city councillor Jules Radich to the incumbent Aaron Hawkins.

The Mayor's role is 'to provide leadership to the other elected members of the territorial authority, be a leader in the community and perform civic duties'. Voting was held using Single Transferable Vote (STV). Ballots were accepted until midday on 8 October by post or by dropping off completed voting papers. The mayoral election was combined with elections for the Dunedin City Council, Community Boards, and the Otago Regional Council.

== Candidates ==
=== Declared candidates ===
Policies are outlined in candidate profiles and policies on major issues.

- Bill Acklin, former city councillor
- Sophie Barker, city councillor
- Jett Groshinski
- Aaron Hawkins, incumbent mayor
- Carmen Houlahan, city councillor
- Mandy Mayhem-Bullock, Waikouaiti Coast Community Board member
- David Milne
- Jules Radich, city councillor
- Rich Seager
- Lee Vandervis, city councillor
- Pamela Taylor

=== Declined to be candidates ===
- David Benson-Pope, city councillor (endorsed Hawkins)
- Clare Curran, former Labour MP
- Christine Garey, deputy mayor (endorsed Hawkins)
- Jim O'Malley, city councillor
- Ian Taylor, businessman
- Steve Walker, city councillor (endorsed Hawkins)
- Andrew Whiley, city councillor (endorsed Radich)
- Michael Woodhouse, National MP

== Results ==
2022 Dunedin mayoral election
| Party | Candidate | FPv% | Count | | | | | | | | |
| Party | Candidate | FPv% | 1 | 2 | 3 | 4 | 5 | 6 | 7 | 8 | 9 |
|---|---|---|---|---|---|---|---|---|---|---|---|
| Team Dunedin | Jules Radich | 36.32 | 17,184 | 17,224 | 17,250 | 17,396 | 17,487 | 17,793 | 18,126 | 18,622 | 21,286 |
| Green Ōtepoti | Aaron Hawkins | 22.08 | 10,445 | 10,451 | 10,530 | 10,562 | 10,920 | 11,019 | 11,087 | 11,241 | 11,388 |
| Independent | Sophie Barker | 15.52 | 7,345 | 7,389 | 7,423 | 7,496 | 7,756 | 7,969 | 8,271 | 8,892 | 9,574 |
| Independent | Lee Vandervis | 12.64 | 5,980 | 6,058 | 6,072 | 6,113 | 6,155 | 6,250 | 6,432 | 6,574 | |
| Independent | Carmen Houlahan | 3.34 | 1,582 | 1,593 | 1,633 | 1,676 | 1,782 | 1,916 | 2,087 | | |
| Independent | Bill Acklin | 2.80 | 1,326 | 1,355 | 1,362 | 1,400 | 1,440 | 1,519 | | | |
| Independent | David Joseph Milne | 2.30 | 1,090 | 1,104 | 1,121 | 1,231 | 1,266 | | | | |
| Independent | Mandy Mayhem-Bullock | 2.29 | 1,082 | 1,099 | 1,164 | 1,181 | | | | | |
| Southern Independents | Richard Seager | 1.29 | 612 | 641 | 651 | | | | | | |
| Independent | Jett Groshinski | 0.70 | 333 | 335 | | | | | | | |
| Independent | Pamela Taylor | 0.70 | 332 | | | | | | | | |
Valid: 47,311 Spoilt: 106 Quota: 21,124 (final)

== See also ==
- 2022 Dunedin City Council election
- 2022 Otago Regional Council election
