= Sophie Barker (mayor) =

New Zealand politician

Her Worship Sophie Barker

60th Mayor of Dunedin
- Incumbent
- Assumed office 17 October 2025
- Deputy: Cherry Lucas
- Preceded by: Jules Radich

Personal details
- Born: Sophie Elizabeth Barker; 1966 or 1967 (age 59–60)
- Education: University of Otago

Sophie Elizabeth Barker (born 1966 or 1967) is a New Zealand politician. She has served as mayor of Dunedin since October 2025, having been a Dunedin city councillor since 2019 and deputy mayor between 2022 and 2023. Barker is the city's second female mayor since Sukhi Turner, who served as mayor between 1995 and 2004. Barker is a centre-left independent politician.

== Early life and career ==
Barker spent her childhood growing up in Dunedin's Larnach Castle. She studied and worked in marketing and tourism. Barker also worked for the Dunedin City Council.

== Local government career ==
=== City councillor, 2019–2025 ===
Barker was first elected as a councillor to the Dunedin City Council (DCC) during the 2019 New Zealand local elections. Following the 2022 Dunedin City Council election, she was appointed as Deputy Mayor by Mayor of Dunedin Jules Radich in October 2022.

On 11 September 2023, Cr Barker resigned as Deputy Mayor while remaining a councillor, citing a breakdown in her professional relationship with Mayor Radich. She cited Radich's discussion of Council disciplinary proceedings against Barry Williams, the chair of the Strath Taieri Community Board, during an interview with Radio New Zealand on 29 August 2023. Earlier, Williams had racially abused a non-white staff member at the Strath Taieri Hotel in Middlemarch following a mistake with a food order. While the Dunedin City Council had wanted Williams to resign from his position, Radich instead opted to censure Williams after the latter apologised. In addition, Barker and fellow Cr Jim O'Malley also filed a code of conduct complaint against Radich over his handling of William's behaviour. In December 2023, an independent investigation upheld Barker and O'Malley's code of conduct complaint against Radich, who apologised for his actions. In addition, the investigator found that fellow DCC Cr Carmen Houlahan had breached the Council's code of conduct by harrying Barker and O'Malley for lodging a complaint against Radich.

On 26 August 2025, Cr Barker unsuccessfully voted against a DCC motion to scrap the contentious Albany Street road connection project, which passed by a vote of 8 to 7 votes. The Albany Street project would have involved removing 48 carparks near the University of Otago, and installing a cycleway and improving pedestrian access. Local business owners had criticised the DCC for not consulting them about the proposed project. Mayor Radich has used his casting vote to pass the motion after Jim O'Malley recused himself from the proceedings. That same day, Barker supported a motion to scrap free Sunday parking in the Dunedin city centre, which passed by a vote of 11 to 4. On 23 September, Cr Barker supported a revocation motion filed by Cr Christine Garey to revoke the Council's decision to cancel the Albany Street road connection project, which passed by a margin of 8 to 7 votes.

=== Mayoralty, 2025–present ===
During the 2025 Dunedin mayoral election, Barker won the mayoralty, ousting the incumbent Radich. She defeated her main contender, Andrew Simms of the Future Dunedin ticket, by a margin of 105 votes, based on provisional results released on 11 October 2025. Full results released on 18 October confirmed Barker's lead over Simms. Barker was endorsed by Crs Andrew Whiley and Kevin Gilbert, who were previously part of Radich's ticket Team Dunedin.

On 8 November 2025, Barker announced that the DCC would switch from a committee to a portfolio governance model. She became chair of the policy and planning committee and chair of the economic development portfolio. Cr Andrew Simms objected to being appointed as deputy chair of the economic development portfolio, claiming that he was being "sidelined." Barker defended her portfolio allocations, saying that Simms was "taking the new structure personally." On 11 November, Barker and Simms reached a compromise, with the two agreeing to serve as co-chairs of the economic development portfolio. The council also voted by a margin of 13 to 2 votes to adopt Barker's new portfolio governance model.

On 12 November, Barker supported a council motion to accept a budget overspend on the contentious Albany Street Connection Project, which would introduce a cycleway and pedestrian safety project to the street which is near the University of Otago's Dunedin campus and student flats. Local businesses had objected to the pedestrianisation project prior to the 2025 local elections due to concerns about parking and declining road traffic. The motion passed by a margin of 8 to 7 votes. The Albany Street Connection Project is estimated to cost NZ$3 million, with the New Zealand Transport Agency contributing $1.53 million in funding.

On 27 November, Barker supported a council motion advanced by Crs Andrew Simms and Russel Lund to establish a homelessness outreach service by contracting a community organisation. It passed by a margin of 8 to 7 votes, with the Mayor casting the deciding vote. Opponents of the motion including Crs Marie Laufiso and Mandy Mayhem had favoured establishing an in-house homelessness service rather than contracting out services to a community organisation. On 24 April 2026, the Council overturned the previous motion to contract a community organisation to provide homeless outreach services by a margin of 7 to 6 votes. Though Barker had opposed the second motion, she supported a new motion on the same day for the DCC to provide in-house homeless outreach services; which passed by a margin of 9 to 3 votes.

On 8 December 2025, Barker was appointed as the head of the committee that monitors the DCC's CEO. In mid-February 2026, Barker opposed a motion to reinstate the Council's grants sub-committee for community groups to apply for funding applications. The motion passed by a margin of 8 to 6 votes with the support of several councillors including Steve Walker, Laufiso, Mayhem and Simms.

On 23 April 2026, Barker supported a motion to reinstate a fireworks display at the Dunedin Civic Centre for the 2027 New Year's Eve celebrations, which passed by a margin of seven to six votes. The Council had discontinued fireworks displays in 2021. Barker had previously voted against fireworks displays but had changed her position, stating "It's really important for us to put on a good show."

As Mayor of Dunedin, Barker also supported an application by the DCC to apply for a NZ$1.5 million Regional Infrastructure Fund (RIF) application to address Dunedin's flooding issues. The Council had sought funding to design and plan water storage facilities at South Dunedin's Forbury and Tonga Parks. In early November 2026, the Fund's management declined the DCC's application, with Kānoa Regional Economic Development and Investment Unit regions general manager Kay Read saying that the high demand for applications by councils exceeded the amount of funding available. Barker expressed disappointment with the decision, saying: "It's obviously really disappointing to miss out on funding, especially when the issues faced in South Dunedin in terms of climate change and adaptation are not unique to South Dunedin."

== Views and positions ==
As Mayor, Barker supported Parliament's passage of the Crimes Legislation (Stalking and Harassment) Amendment Act 2025, which makes stalking a criminal offence punishable by five years' imprisonment. Barker had received death threats online.

== Personal life ==
Barker has a daughter, who is a student at the University of Otago. During her early 40s, Barker underwent three brain surgeries to install a titanium plate and tube in her head.

Political offices
Preceded by Jules Radich	Mayor of Dunedin; 2025–present	Incumbent
