= 2025 Dunedin City Council election =

Elections in New Zealand

- 11 October 2025
- Turnout: 43,300 (45.72% ▼4.18 pp)
- Mayor
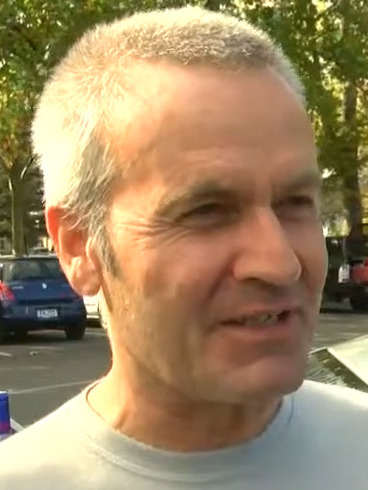

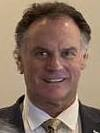

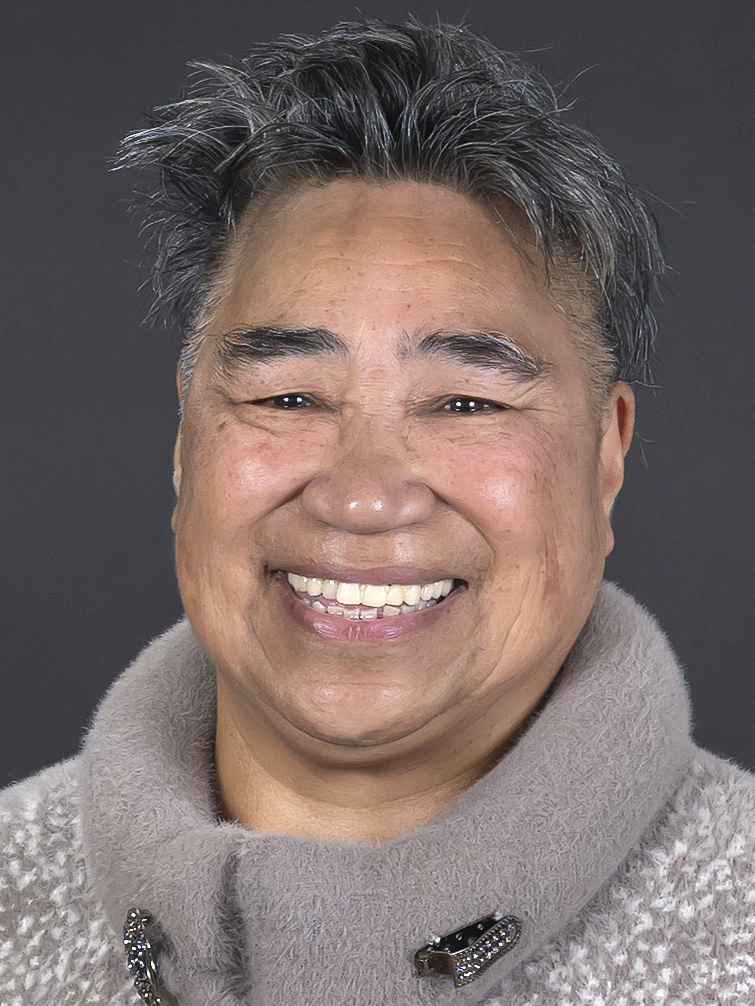
	Ind		Ind
Candidate	Sophie Barker	Andrew Simms	Lee Vandervis
Party	Independent	Future Dunedin	Independent
Primary vote	10,382	11,377	7,234
Percentage	23.98%	26.28%	16.71%
Final vote	16,874	15,976	excluded
Percentage	51.37%	48.63%
Candidate	Jules Radich	Marie Laufiso
Party	Independent	Building Kotahitaka
Primary vote	3,485	2,437
Percentage	8.05%	5.63%
Final vote	excluded	excluded
Mayor before election
Jules Radich
Team Dunedin
Elected mayor
Sophie Barker
Independent
- Councillors
- 14 seats on the governing body of Dunedin City Council; 8 seats needed for a majority
Party	Seats	+/–
Independent	10	0
Future Dunedin	1	+1
Building Kotahitaka	1	+1
Green	1	+1
Labour	1	0
This lists parties that won seats. See the complete results below.

The 2025 Dunedin City Council election was a local election held from 9 September to 11 October in Dunedin, New Zealand, as part of that year's territorial authority elections and other local elections held nation-wide.

Voters elected the mayor of Dunedin and 14 city councillors, and other local representatives for the 2025–2028 term of the Dunedin City Council. Postal voting and the single transferable vote system were used.

Councillor Sophie Barker won the mayoralty, defeating incumbent mayor Jules Radich.

== Key dates ==
- 4 July 2025: Nominations for candidates opened
- 1 August 2025: Nominations for candidates closed at 12 pm
- 9 September 2025: Voting documents were posted and voting opened
- 11 October 2025: Voting closed at 12 pm and progress/preliminary results were published
- 16–19 October 2025: Final results were declared.

== Background ==
=== Positions up for election ===
Voters in the city elected the mayor of Dunedin, 14 city councillors at-large, the members of six community boards, (Note: Strath Taieri, Waikouaiti Coast, Mosgiel-Taieri, Saddle Hill, West Harbour, and Otago Peninsula.) and the members of the Oamaru Licensing Trust. They also elected 7 members of the Otago Regional Council. (Note: 5 councillors representing the city exclusively.; 2 councillors representing parts of the city and parts of neighbouring Clutha District.)

== Campaign ==
=== Debates ===
On 17 June 2025, Dunedin climate advocate Bruce Mahalski held a public meeting for DCC council and mayoral candidates to field questions on climate change issues including a commercial train service, the city's Zero Carbon Plan 2030, and relations between the DCC and Otago Regional Council (ORC). Mayoral candidates Cr Sophie Barker and Andrew Simms, and city council candidates Cr Marie Laufiso, Cr Jim O'Malley and Lily Warring spoke at the meeting, which was attended by 50 people.

=== Issues ===
One key election issue has been the proposed landfill site at Smooth Hill. While the incumbent Mayor Jules Radich has supported the Smooth Hill landfill site, mayoral candidate Andrew Simms and his Future Dunedin ticket have opposed the new landfill site.

On 23 September, 15 left-wing DCC and ORC candidates established an alternative progressive alliance called "The People's Hub" to advocate on shared values such as climate action, social justice, traffic speed reductions and reviving passenger trains. The group consisted of candidates from the Labour, Green parties, the Radical Action Faction and Building Kotahitaka including Cr Steve Walker, Cr Marie Laufiso, Cr Alan Somerville and ORC candidate Alex King. The group established a hub at the corner of George Street and Moray Place in Dunedin to promote their causes and encourage people to vote.

== List of candidates ==
=== Incumbents not seeking re-election ===
- David Benson-Pope, incumbent councillor since 2013

=== Mayor ===
Incumbent mayor Jules Radich would stand again as an independent candidate. Other independent candidates included councillors Sophie Barker, Carmen Houlahan, Mandy Mayhem, and Lee Vandervis. Candidates that stood under a ticket were Marie Laufiso as the Building Kotahitaka candidate, Andrew Simms as the Future Dunedin candidate and Mickey Treadwell as the Green candidate.

==== Endorsements ====
In mid June 2025, former Team Dunedin councillors Andrew Whiley and Kevin Gilbert endorsed Sophie Barker as mayoral candidate.

=== Councillors ===
Fourteen councillors were elected at-large to the city council.

Candidate	Affiliation (Note: A candidate may leave their affiliation blank, run as an independent, or run with an affiliation to an organisation, local body ticket or political party.)	Notes
Bill Acklin	Independent	Incumbent councillor
Lachlan Akers	None	
Lync Aronson	Independent-Fully Funded City Council	Also ran for mayor
Sophie Barker	Independent – working for you	Incumbent councillor. Also ran for mayor.
Tony Bennett	None	
Rachel Brazil	Independent	Lawyer. Was previously affiliated with the Future Dunedin ticket but withdrew on 20 August after facing criticism for sharing a leaked confidential report about DCC chief executive Sandy Graham.
Heike Cebulla-Elder	None	High School teacher
John Chambers	Your Health Candidate	Former head of the emergency department at Dunedin Hospital
Sarah Davie-Nitis	Independent	
Cyndee Elder	Building Kotahitaka	Creator of Able Abodes, a tiny home project.
Rose Finnie	Green	Support worker
Jo Galer	Independent	Leader of the Southern Heritage Trust and Otago Regional Council communications professional She left the Future Dunedin ticket to stand as an independent candidate in late August 2025 following disagreements with the leadership.
Christine Garey	Independent	Incumbent councillor
Kevin Gilbert	Independent	Incumbent councillor
Jett Groshinski	Labour	Otago University Students' Association politics representative and 2022 mayoral and local council candidate
Doug Hall	None	Also ran for mayor
Robert Hamlin	Independent	University of Otago Business School lecturer. Was previously running under the Future Dunedin ticket until he was removed after he circulated an email criticising the use of karakia (Māori prayers) at university meetings.
Karl Hart	None	
Jarrod Hodson	Future Dunedin	West Harbour community board member and commercial manager
Carmen Houlahan	Independent	Incumbent councillor. Also ran for mayor.
Marita Johnson	Independent	Previously stood for council in 2022
Anthony Kenny	ACT Local	Former Royal New Zealand Navy serviceman
Anna Knight	Building Kotahitaka	
Richard Knights	Independent	
Marie Laufiso	Building Kotahitaka	Incumbent councillor. Also ran for mayor.
Cherry Lucas	Independent	Deputy mayor and incumbent city councillor
Russell Lund	Independent	
Lianna MacFarlane	Independent	Also ran for mayor
Mandy Mayhem	None	Incumbent councillor. Also ran for mayor.
David Milne	Independent	Also ran for mayor.
Jim O'Malley	Independent	Incumbent councillor
Hugh "Captain" O'Neill	Independent	
Jen Olsen	The Radical Action Faction	
Benedict Ong	None	Also ran for mayor
Marian Poole	None	
Paul Pope	Independent	Incumbent chair of the Otago Peninsula community board
Bruce Ranga	Future Dunedin	Former CEO of the Torres Strait Island Regional Council and member of the Te Pae Oranga Iwi Community Panel
Evelyn Robertson	Independent	Events Lead Dunedin Pride
Daniel Rooney	None	
Andrew Simms	Future Dunedin	Businessman, Mosgiel-Taieri Community Board chairman and founder of Future Dunedin. Also ran for mayor.
Conrad Stedman	Future Dunedin	Former city councillor
Andrew Sutton	Future Dunedin	President of Taieri Cricket Club and school boards chairperson
Amy Taylor	Future Dunedin	Volunteer and disability advocate
Pamela Taylor	Independent	Previously ran for council and for the mayoralty in 2022. Also ran for mayor.
Sue Todd	Independent	
Mickey Treadwell	Green	Video game programmer and part-time lecturer. Also ran for mayor.
Rebecca Twemlow	Future Dunedin	Director of Business South and former Vice President of the Otago Chamber of Commerce
Lee Vandervis	Independent	Incumbent councillor. Also ran for mayor.
Steve Walker	Labour	Incumbent councillor
Lily Warring	Green	Visual designer
Brent Weatherall	None	Incumbent councillor since 2022
Andrew Whiley	Independent	Incumbent councillor
Paul Williams	None	

== Results ==
=== Composition ===
Ward	2022		Elected	
Mayor	Team Dunedin	Jules Radich	Independent	Sophie Barker
At-large	Independent	Bill Acklin	Independent	Andrew Simms
At-large	Independent	Lee Vandervis	Independent	Lee Vandervis
At-large	Independent	Sophie Barker	Independent	Jules Radich
At-large	Independent	Marie Laufiso	Building Kotahitaka	Marie Laufiso
At-large	Independent	David Benson-Pope^{R}	Independent	John Chambers
At-large	Team Dunedin	Kevin Gilbert	Independent	Russell Lund
At-large	Team Dunedin	Brent Weatherall	Independent	Brent Weatherall
At-large	Labour	Steve Walker	Labour	Steve Walker
At-large	Independent	Cherry Lucas	Independent	Cherry Lucas
At-large	Independent	Carmen Houlahan	Green	Mickey Treadwell
At-large	Independent	Mandy Mayhem	Independent	Mandy Mayhem
At-large	Independent	Jim O'Malley	Independent	Benedict Ong
At-large	Independent	Christine Garey	Independent	Christine Garey
At-large	Team Dunedin	Andrewy Whiley	Independent	Doug Hall
^{R} did not run for re-election

=== Mayor ===
Councillor Sophie Barker was confirmed as mayor, with Andrew Simms coming in second place. Incumbent mayor Jules Radich came in fourth place, behind councillor Lee Vandervis.

2025 Dunedin mayoral election
Party	Candidate	Primary votes	%	±%	Iteration	
Party	Candidate	Primary votes	%	±%	#	Votes
Independent	Sophie Barker	10,382	23.98	+8.72	15th	16,874
Future Dunedin	Andrew Simms	11,377	26.27	(new)	15th	15,976
Independent	Lee Vandervis	7,234	16.71	+4.29	14th	8,739
Independent	Jules Radich^{†}	3,485	8.05	−27.65	13th	4,174
Building Kotahitaka	Marie Laufiso	2,437	5.63	(new)	12th	4,001
Green	Mickey Treadwell	1,967	4.54	(new)	11th	2,491
Independent	Mandy Mayhem	1,259	2.91	+0.66	10th	1,480
Independent	Benedict Ong	947	2.19	(new)	9th	1,248
Independent	Carmen Houlahan	758	1.75	−1.54	8th	1,017
Independent	Doug Hall	675	1.56	(new)	7th	797
Independent	Lync Aronson	657	1.52	(new)	6th	739
Independent	Lianna MacFarlane	422	0.97	(new)	5th	497
Independent	David Milne	344	0.79	−1.47	4th	360
Radical Action	Ruthven Allimrac	296	0.68	(new)	3rd	314
Independent	Pamela Taylor	149	0.34	−0.35	2nd	149
Silly Hat	Flynn (Nisvett) Nisbett	73	0.17	(new)	1st	73
Quota		21,231	49.03	−0.12		
Informal votes		106	0.24	+0.02		
Blank votes		727	1.68	+0.85		
Turnout		43,300	45.72	−4.18		
Registered electors		94,717				
Independent gain from Team Dunedin on 15th iteration						
^{†} incumbent

=== Council ===
2025 Dunedin at-large election
Party	Candidate	Primary votes	%	±%	Iteration	
Party	Candidate	Primary votes	%	±%	#	Votes
Future Dunedin	Andrew Simms	7,540	17.41	(new)	1st	7,540
Independent	Lee Vandervis^{†}	6,461	14.92	+1.68	1st	6,461
Independent	Jules Radich	2,102	4.85	+4.85	2nd	2,916
Building Kotahitaka	Marie Laufiso^{†}	2,410	5.57	−1.62	47th	2,785
Independent	John Chambers	1,665	3.85	(new)	65th	2,770
Independent	Russell Lund	1,051	2.43	(new)	69th	2,733
Independent	Brent Weatherall^{†}	941	2.17	−5.76	74th	2,664
Labour	Steve Walker^{†}	1,618	3.74	−0.21	76th	2,670
Independent	Cherry Lucas^{†}	1,320	3.05	+1.10	76th	2,656
Green	Mickey Treadwell	1,299	3.00	(new)	77th	2,658
Independent	Mandy Mayhem^{†}	1,356	3.13	+0.48	81st	2,651
Independent	Benedict Ong	891	2.06	(new)	81st	2,596
Independent	Christine Garey^{†}	1,236	2.85	−1.03	84th	2,592
Independent	Doug Hall	686	1.58	+0.47	87th	2,577
Future Dunedin	Bruce Ranga	443	1.02	(new)	87th	2,372
Independent	Andrew Whiley^{†}	691	1.60	−4.80	78th	1,739
Independent	Carmen Houlahan^{†}	605	1.40	−1.62	75th	1,563
Future Dunedin	Conrad Stedman	417	0.96	(new)	71st	1,438
Independent	Bill Acklin^{†}	607	1.40	−1.80	68th	1,270
Future Dunedin	Rachel Brazil	562	1.30	(new)	66th	1,174
Independent	Lync Aronson	578	1.33	(new)	64th	1,025
Green	Rose Finnie	449	1.04	(new)	62nd	914
Future Dunedin	Jo Galer	406	0.94	(new)	60th	876
Future Dunedin	Rebecca (Bex) Twemlow	346	0.80	(new)	58th	813
Independent	Paul Pope	558	1.29	(new)	56th	781
Independent	Jim O'Malley^{†}	530	1.22	−1.66	54th	726
Independent	Lianna MacFarlane	322	0.74	(new)	52nd	644
Green	Lily Warring	468	1.08	(new)	50th	613
Future Dunedin	Andrew Sutton	236	0.55	(new)	48th	570
Independent	Richard Knights	415	0.96	−0.10	46th	537
Future Dunedin	Jarrod Hodson	283	0.65	(new)	44th	509
ACT Local	Anthony Kenny	273	0.63	(new)	42nd	468
Independent	Sarah Davie-Nitis	296	0.68	(new)	40th	451
Independent	Kevin Gilbert^{†}	292	0.67	−1.14	38th	429
Labour	Jett Groshinski	332	0.77	−0.35	36th	402
Independent	Hugh O'Neill	160	0.37	(new)	34th	311
Independent	David Milne	184	0.42	(new)	33rd	305
Independent	Tony Bennett	218	0.50	(new)	30th	298
Independent	Heike Cebulla-Elder	243	0.56	(new)	27th	281
Independent	Paul Williams	227	0.52	(new)	25th	278
Independent	Sue Todd	155	0.36	(new)	22nd	267
Independent	Robert Hamlin	162	0.37	(new)	20th	259
Independent	Lachlan Akers	207	0.48	(new)	18th	234
Independent	Pamela Taylor	116	0.27	−0.22	16th	231
Future Dunedin	Amy Taylor	131	0.30	(new)	14th	210
Radical Action	Jen Olsen	172	0.40	(new)	13th	187
Independent	Daniel Rooney	164	0.38	(new)	12th	184
Building Kotahitaka	Anna Knight	108	0.25	(new)	11th	115
Independent	Evelyn Robertson	72	0.17	(new)	10th	78
Independent	Marian Poole	63	0.15	(new)	9th	68
Building Kotahitaka	Cyndee Elder	60	0.14	(new)	8th	67
Independent	Marita Johnson	47	0.11	−0.05	5th	53
Independent	Karla Hart	14	0.03	(new)	4th	19
Independent	Sophie Barker^{†} (withdrawn, elected mayor)	n/a	n/a	n/a	1st	0
Quota		2,813	6.50	+0.18		
Informal votes		579	1.34	−0.66		
Blank votes		423	0.98	−0.81		
Turnout		43,300	45.72	−4.18		
Registered electors		94,717				
Future Dunedin gain from Independent on 1st iteration						
Independent hold on 1st iteration						
Independent gain from Independent on 2nd iteration						
Building Kotahitaka gain from Independent on 47th iteration						
Independent gain from Independent on 65th iteration						
Independent gain from Independent on 69th iteration						
Independent hold on 74th iteration						
Labour hold on 76th iteration						
Independent hold on 76th iteration						
Green gain from Independent on 77th iteration						
Independent hold on 81st iteration						
Independent gain from Team Dunedin on 81st iteration						
Independent gain from Team Dunedin on 84th iteration						
Independent gain from Team Dunedin on 87th iteration						
^{†} incumbent

== Aftermath ==
Following the death of Cr and former Mayor Jules Radich, the Dunedin City Council announced that a by-election would be held on 12 May 2026.

== See also ==
- 2025 Queenstown-Lakes District Council election
