= 2022 Dunedin City Council election =

Elections in New Zealand

- 8 October 2022
- Turnout: 46,509 (48.21%)
- Mayoral election
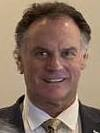

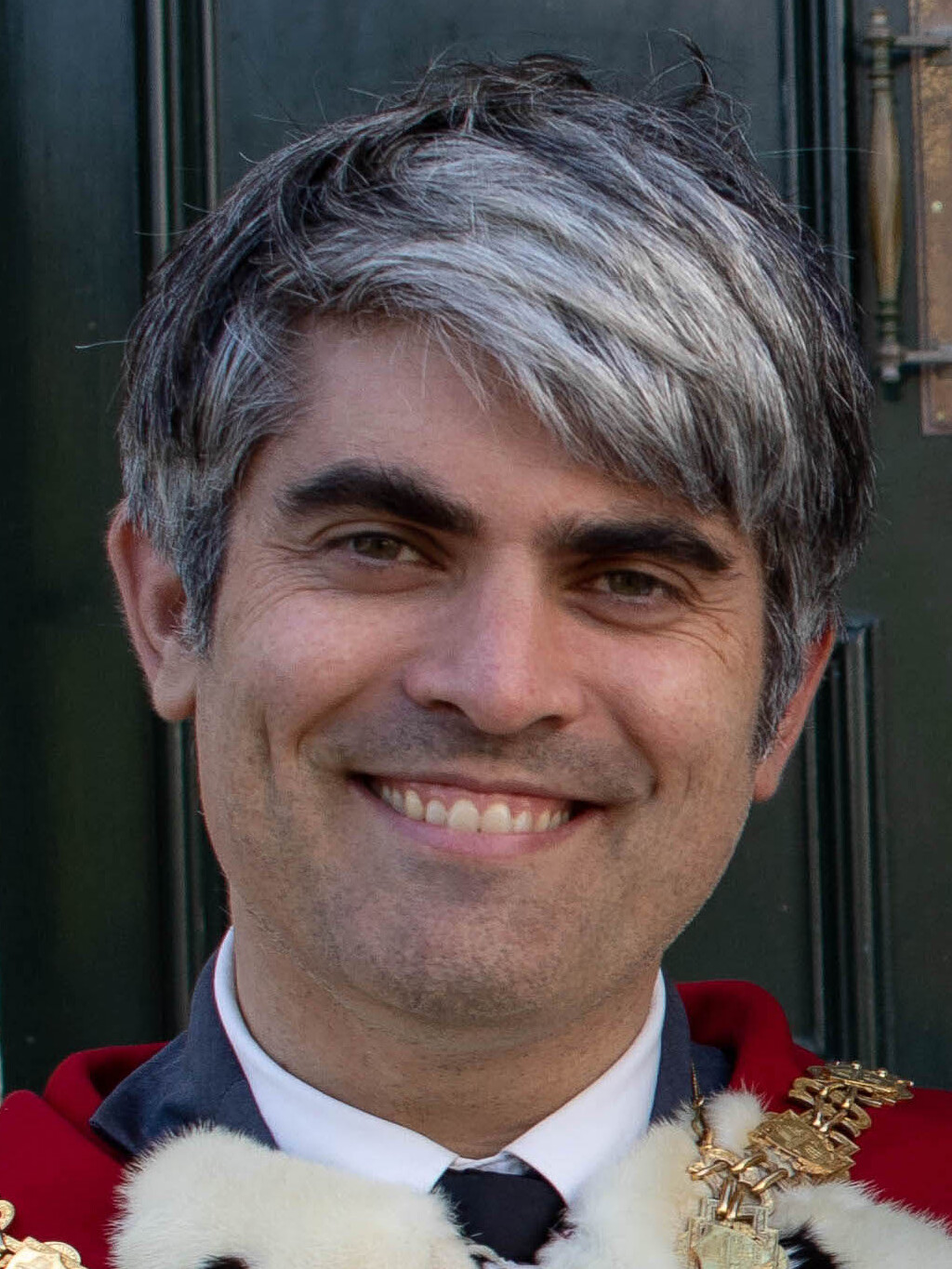

Candidate	Jules Radich	Aaron Hawkins	Sophie Barker
Affiliation	Team Dunedin	Green	Independent
Primary vote	17,184	10,445	7,345
Percentage	36.32%	22.08%	15.52%
Final vote	21,286	11,388	9,574
Percentage	50.38%	26.96%	22.66%
Mayor before election
Aaron Hawkins
Elected mayor
Jules Radich
- Council election
- 14 seats on the Dunedin City Council; 8 seats needed for a majority
Party	Seats	+/–
Independents	9	−2
Team Dunedin	3	+3
Labour	1	0
Green	1	0
This lists parties that won seats. See the complete results below.

The 2022 Dunedin City Council election was held via postal voting between September and October 2022 as part of the wider 2022 New Zealand local elections.

== Council ==
The Dunedin City Council used the single transferable voting system to elect the Mayor of Dunedin and city councillors for the 2022-2025 term. Voter turnout was 48.21%. The positions of mayor and fourteen city councillors elected at-large were contested by the following candidates:

=== Mayor ===
Jules Radich, a city councillor from 2019 to 2022, and candidate for mayor in the 2019 election, won the mayoral election, defeating incumbent Green candidate Aaron Hawkins.

2022 Dunedin mayoral election
Party	Candidate	FPv%	Count								
Party	Candidate	FPv%	1	2	3	4	5	6	7	8	9
Team Dunedin	Jules Radich	36.32%	17,184	17,224	17,250	17,396	17,487	17,793	18,126	18,622	21,286
Green Ōtepoti	Aaron Hawkins†	22.08%	10,445	10,451	10,530	10,562	10,920	11,019	11,087	11,241	11,388
Independent	Sophie Barker	15.52%	7,345	7,389	7,423	7,496	7,756	7,969	8,271	8,892	9,574
Independent	Lee Vandervis	12.64%	5,980	6,058	6,072	6,113	6,155	6,250	6,432	6,574	
Independent	Carmen Houlahan	3.34%	1,582	1,593	1,633	1,676	1,782	1,916	2,087		
Independent	Bill Acklin	2.8%	1,326	1,355	1,362	1,400	1,440	1,519			
Independent	David Joseph Milne	2.3%	1,090	1,104	1,121	1,231	1,266				
Independent	Mandy Mayhem-Bullock	2.29%	1,082	1,099	1,164	1,181					
Southern Independents	Richard Seager	1.29%	612	641	651						
Independent	Jett Groshinski	0.7%	333	335							
Independent	Pamela Taylor	0.7%	332								
Valid: 47311 Spoilt: 106 + 400 blank Quota: 1st iteration: 23,656; final iteration: 21,124

†Incumbent candidate

=== Councillors ===
2022 Dunedin City Council – Council at-large election
Party	Candidate	First count	FPv%	Iter	Quota	Result
Independent	Sophie Barker†	7,361	16.12%	1	3,044.13	Elected
Independent	Lee Vandervis†	6,372	13.95%	1	3,044.13	Elected
Team Dunedin	Brent Weatherall	3,816	8.36%	1	3,044.13	Elected
Green Ōtepoti	Marie Laufiso†	3,461	7.58%	1	3,044.13	Elected
Team Dunedin	Andrew Whiley†	3,082	6.75%	1	3,044.13	Elected
Independent	Bill Acklin	1,542	3.38%	42	2,909.76	Elected
Independent	Christine Garey†	1,866	4.09%	42	2,909.76	Elected
Labour	Steve Walker†	1,903	4.17%	51	2,885.64	Elected
Independent	Jim O'Malley†	1,385	3.03%	52	2,884.62	Elected
Independent	Carmen Houlahan†	1,453	3.18%	53	2,862.65	Elected
Team Dunedin	Kevin Gilbert	870	1.91%	58	2,835.64	Elected
Independent	Mandy Mayhem-Bullock	1,274	2.79%	67	2,751.44	Elected
Independent	David Benson-Pope†	1,077	2.36%	68	2,743.25	Elected
Independent	Cherry Lucas	940	2.06%	73	2,721.58	Elected
Independent	Rachel Elder†	820	1.8%	73	2,721.58	Excluded
Independent	Robyn McLean	896	1.96%	64	2,797.13	Excluded
Team Dunedin	Lynette Scott	470	1.03%	57	2,851.02	Excluded
Independent	Chris McBride	693	1.52%	52	2,884.62	Excluded
Labour	Joy Davis	699	1.53%	49	2,895.87	Excluded
Team Dunedin	Callum Steele	393	0.86%	47	2,906.51	Excluded
Southern Independents	Richard Seager	541	1.18%	41	2,918.83	Excluded
Independent	Doug Hall Jr†	536	1.17%	37	2,933.22	Excluded
Independent	Randal Scott	612	1.34%	34	2,943.70	Excluded
Independent	Jett Groshinski	537	1.18%	33	2,948.61	Excluded
Independent	Richard Knights	510	1.12%	31	2,953.48	Excluded
Team Dunedin	Cheryl May Neill	312	0.68%	29	2,957.98	Excluded
Independent	Bruce Mitchell	371	0.81%	27	2,967.02	Excluded
Independent	Tracey Pita	277	0.61%	25	2,975.48	Excluded
Independent	Peter Barron	319	0.7%	22	2,977.34	Excluded
Independent	Vick Veera	272	0.6%	19	2,981.41	Excluded
Independent	Pamela Taylor	234	0.51%	17	2,985.35	Excluded
Independent	Michael Lee	182	0.4%	15	2,987.67	Excluded
Independent	Chriss Hamilton	162	0.35%	14	2,988.71	Excluded
Pro-Freedom Jedi	Malcolm Moncrief-Spittle	120	0.26%	13	2,989.52	Excluded
Independent	Rob Waide	81	0.18%	12	2,990.57	Excluded
Independent	Marita Johnson	76	0.17%	11	2,991.10	Excluded
Independent	Nathan Gordon	72	0.16%	9	2,991.89	Excluded
Independent	Veronica Jackman	64	0.14%	6	2,992.57	Excluded
Independent	David Smith	11	0.02%	5	2,992.71	Excluded
Team Dunedin	Jules Radich†	-	-	1	3,044.13	Withdrawn*
Valid votes: 45662; Spoilt: 961 + 860 blank

*Withdrawn due to being elected as mayor
†Incumbent candidate

== Other local elections ==
Depending on where in Dunedin they lived, voters also voted in concurrent local elections for the:

- Otago Regional Council:
  - Dunedin Constituency, or
  - Molyneux Constituency

and

- Strath Taieri Community Board
- Waikouaiti Coast Community Board
- Mosgiel-Taieri Community Board
- Saddle Hill Community Board
- West Harbour Community Board, or
- Otago Peninsula Community Board

and/or

- Oamaru Licensing Trust.
