= Benedict Ong =

New Zealand politician

Dunedin city councillor
- Incumbent
- Assumed office 17 October 2025

Personal details
- Born: 1983 (age 42–43) Dunedin, New Zealand
- Education: University of New South Wales
- Website: Official website

Benedict Alvin Ong is a New Zealand local government politician in Dunedin, New Zealand. He is a councillor of the Dunedin City Council, in his first term. He has gained significant media attention following his censure by the council. The city council voted 10–2 on 26 March 2026 to request Ong resign, which he rejected. During the meeting, Ong chose to read from Franz Kafka's novel The Trial instead of defending himself.

In 2026, Ong was subsequently found to have breached the Council's code of conduct in two further incidents; namely leaking information about the planned construction of a new hotel and posting social media remarks attacking the Council's chief executive. In September 2026, he was also trespassed from the University of Otago for "inappropriate behaviour." Ong also contested the 2026 New Zealand general election as an independent candidate but was unsuccessful. Despite initially stating he would step down from the City Council in late 2026, Ong subsequently said he would remain until October 2027 to avoid triggering a by-election.

== Early life and career ==
Benedict Ong has claimed that he was born in Dunedin. He and his family subsequently moved to Australia where he received most of his schooling. Ong later studied finance at the University of New South Wales, graduating with a bachelor of commerce in 2004.

He worked as an associate director in Rabobank Singapore's mergers and acquisitions team between 2007 and 2010. Between May 2013 and December 2017, Ong was employed by the Royal Bank of Canada's (RBC) wealth management team in Singapore. In addition, he also worked for the United Overseas Bank (UOB). Ong has also claimed to have held senior leadership positions at the RBC, Rabobank International, UOB and Bank Sarasin-Rabo. These claims have been disputed by Councillor Lee Vandervis, who has accepted that Ong's work experience had included lower-level banking.

== Political career ==
=== 2025 Dunedin City Council election ===
During the 2025 Dunedin City Council election, Ong campaigned on a platform of economic expertise and leadership, citing his investment banking career and making use of Facebook to connect with voters. On 11 October 2025, he was elected to the Dunedin City Council with 2,596 votes. He also contested the 2025 Dunedin mayoral election, coming in eighth place with 947 votes. During the 2025 election campaign, Ong was the highest-spending candidate, spending $44,098.72 on his campaigns.

=== First code of conduct complaint, February–March 2026 ===
On 19 December 2025, Ong filed a code of conduct complaint against fellow Councillor John Chambers for allegedly making "discriminatory comments" against Dunedin's South Asian community during a workshop on 12 December. Chambers has disputed Ong's allegations. Despite being instructed by DCC CEO Sandra Graham not to compromise the investigation by making public comments, Ong published a social media post in mid-January 2026 detailing his complaint against Chambers and accused Graham of being derelict in her duties by not disciplining Chambers.

On 5 February 2026, Graham filed a code of conduct complaint against Ong. Independent investigator Steph Dyhrberg was appointed to investigate Ong. She was also investigating Ong's complaint against Chambers. On 9 February, Ong shared a transcript of his 27 January interview with Dyhrberg in which he claimed that she had enough evidence to proceed with his complaint against Chambers. Dyhrberg disagreed with the quality of Ong's evidence.

On 11 February, Ong stated that he would not cooperate with Dyhrberg's investigation into the code of conduct complaint against him. That same day, Dyhrberg dismissed Ong's complaint against Chambers on the grounds it lacked substance and there was "insufficient grounds" to continue the investigation. In response, Ong rejected the findings of Dyhrberg's investigation, saying that he did not consider her or her findings to "be independent."

In mid February 2026, Graham restricted Ong's access to the Dunedin Civic Centre following allegations that he had accosted staff. In response, Ong said that the restriction was a "retaliatory response" against his efforts to promote his debt financing proposals to "freeze future rate rises." In addition, Mayor of Dunedin Sophie Barker barred Ong from participating in informal meetings with Members of Parliament and councils due to several code of conduct violations including his online remarks against Graham. When Ong tried to attend an informal meeting with Labour MPs on 20 February in defiance of this suspension, he was escorted out of the meeting by Councillors Chambers, Doug Hall, Mickey Treadwell and Andrew Simms. In protest, Ong wore tape over his mouth. Ong was also stripped of his role as deputy lead of the technology portfolio.

By early March 2026, Ong had declined to apologise to either CEO Graham or Mayor Barker. On 10 March, Dyhrberg found that Ong had tried to smear a witness in his code of conduct case against Chambers and that his behaviour amounted to a serious breach of the DCC's code of conduct. The Dunedin City Council also convened a meeting on 25 March 2026 to discuss disciplinary sanctions against Ong. In addition, Mayor Barker also sought approval from the DCC to remove Ong as the Council's representative on the Otago Settlers Association and the Toitū Otago Settlers Museum board, and to reduce his annual remuneration from NZ$100,000 to about $84,500. On 21 March, acting DCC chief executive Scott McLean ordered Ong to remove defamatory posts from his social media page relating to the Council disciplinary proceedings against him.

During the disciplinary meeting on 25 March, the DCC heard the findings of Dyhrberg's code of conduct investigation against Ong, including the attempted discrediting of a witness for not supporting his account of a complaint against Councillor Chambers. Ong was given 30 minutes to speak in his own defence but instead chose to read a passage from Franz Kafka's novel The Trial. The Council, except Ong himself, voted to remove him from his roles as Council Representative on the Otago Settlers Association and the Toitū Otago Settlers Museum board. The Council also voted by a margin of ten to three votes (Ong, Vandervis and Andrew Simms) to reduce Ong's annual remuneration from NZ$100,000 to $84,496 for councillors due to his lack of additional responsibilities. The Council also voted by a margin of ten to two votes to urge Ong to resign. Councillor Russell Lund disagreed with the motion, arguing that Ong had a right to serve his full term. Lund also unsuccessfully tried to move an amendment that the DCC not adopt Dyhrberg's report and take no disciplinary action against Ong. In response to the meeting's motions, Ong denied any wrongdoing and rejected calls to resign from the City Council.

In early April 2026, the Otago Daily Times reported that Meta Platforms had restricted access to his Facebook account for "security reasons." Ong contested Meta's decision, saying "that politics was behind the move."

=== Second code of conduct complaint, April–May 2026 ===
On 21 April 2026, Ong leaked a series of emails discussing the proposed construction of a hotel next to the Forsyth Barr Stadium. Mayor Barker and councillors, including Andrew Simms and Doug Hall, criticised Ong for breaching confidentiality policies and potentially jeopardising a commercial development. In response, Ong claimed he was promoting transparency and "accelerating negotiations" between the council-controlled organisation Dunedin Venues and the Russell Property Group. Later that week, Ong was ordered to withdraw a statement claiming that the proposed hotel had been confirmed during a council meeting.

On 29 April 2026, Ong was sent an email notifying him that a complaint that he had breached the Code of Conduct was being investigated. The complaint related to the leaking of two emails concerned the hotel associated with the stadium. It was reported that he leaked that email to other councillors, council staff and several members of the press within six minutes of receiving it.

Dunedin City councillors accepted the Code of Conduct report at a meeting on 18 May 2026, and suspended Ong from all committees and subcommittees for nine months. His access to confidential information and ability to attend non-public workshops were restricted earlier in the month.

=== Third code of conduct complaint, June 2026 ===
In early June 2026, Ong was the subject of a third code of conduct complaint after he allegedly posted confidential information and criticised the Dunedin City Council's chief executive on social media in late May 2026. The complainant Deputy Mayor Cherry Lucas said that Ong had ignored two requests from Mayor Barker to remove the Facebook post.

On 29 October, the Council found that Ong had breached the code of conduct for a third time in relation to his social media remarks about the DCC's chief executive. Councillor Andrew Simms, who chaired the disciplinary meeting, said the council accepted the findings of the investigation and confirmed that Ong had been suspended from all council committees and subcommittees for nine months until July 2027. Ong will still be allowed to attend full council meetings.

=== Fourth code of conduct complaint, November 2026 ===
On 4 November 2026, Ong refused to retract claims that the Council-owned City Forests entity was secretly being sold despite a potential fourth code of conduct complaint. He instead posted a second social media post on 4 November doubling down on his claims. On 5 November, Ong was ordered to leave a Council meeting after arguing with DCC chief executive Richard Briggs about playgrounds.

On 12 November, Briggs filed a fourth code of conduct complaint against Ong after he refused to retract his social media comments that Dunedin's forests were secretly being sold by the 11 November deadline. Jonathan Boyle was appointed as the investigator in charge of the preliminary investigation. In response, Ong leaked the email message to the media and said that the complains were part of "malicious false attacks against me and attempt [sic] to silence me".

=== Notable motions and actions ===
On 30 January 2026, the DCC voted by a margin of 12–2 to reject Ong's motion requesting a report on recognising "significant philanthropic and corporate contributions with naming rights for select public assets."

In late March 2026, the Otago Daily Times reported that Ong had unsuccessfully nominated himself to be a director of the media company New Zealand Media and Entertainment's board.

On 7 September 2026, the Dunedin City Council voted by a margin of 10-3 to reject Ong's proposal for Dunedin to pursue a strategic partnership with an Indian city, similar to Dunedin's existing sister city relations with Shanghai, Edinburgh and Otaru.

=== University of Otago incidents ===
In early August 2026, Radio New Zealand reported that Ong had been ordered to leave two events at the University of Otago including a student protest against tertiary education cuts and a health policy debate hosted by the progressive social media group Big Hairy Network. While Education Action Group 26 spokesperson Annabel Hankin and Big Hairy Network host Mike "Chewie" Bennett accused Ong of disruptive behaviour, Ong contended that he had been denied the chance to speak on both occasions and heckled.

In September 2026 Ong was given a two-year trespass notice by the University of Otago because of what the Otago University Students' Association described as "inappropriate and unwanted behaviours", including "unwanted physical proximity and/or contact with students" during a protest.

=== 2026 general election ===
In late September 2026, Ong confirmed that he would be standing as an independent candidate in the Dunedin electorate at the 2026 New Zealand general election, stating that he wanted to deliver for his hometown of Dunedin. He also claimed that "wrongful bans and political attacks" had made it untenable for him to continue as a city councillor. In early October 2026, Ong received a trespass notice from West Harbour community board member Marian Poole after illegally installing an election bollard on her property. In mid October, Ong published a social media post stating that he intended to resign from the Dunedin City Council if he lost the race for the Dunedin electorate during the 2026 election.

During the 2026 general election held on 7 November, Ong received 265 votes in the Dunedin electorate based on preliminary results; ranking way behind the incumbent Member of Parliament Rachel Brooking. Following the election, he stated that he would delay his resignation until October 2027, 12 months prior to the 2028 New Zealand local elections, to avoid triggering a costly by-election.
