= 2025 Dunedin mayoral election =

New Zealand local election

- 11 October 2025
- Turnout: 43,300 (45.72% ▼4.18 pp)
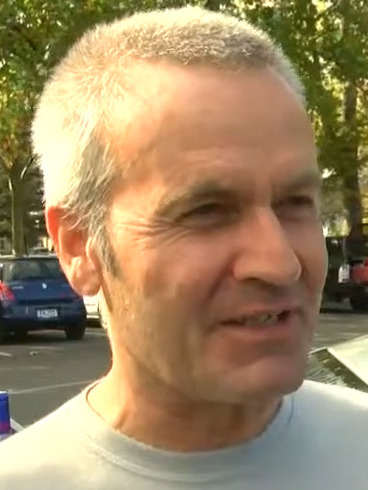

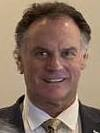

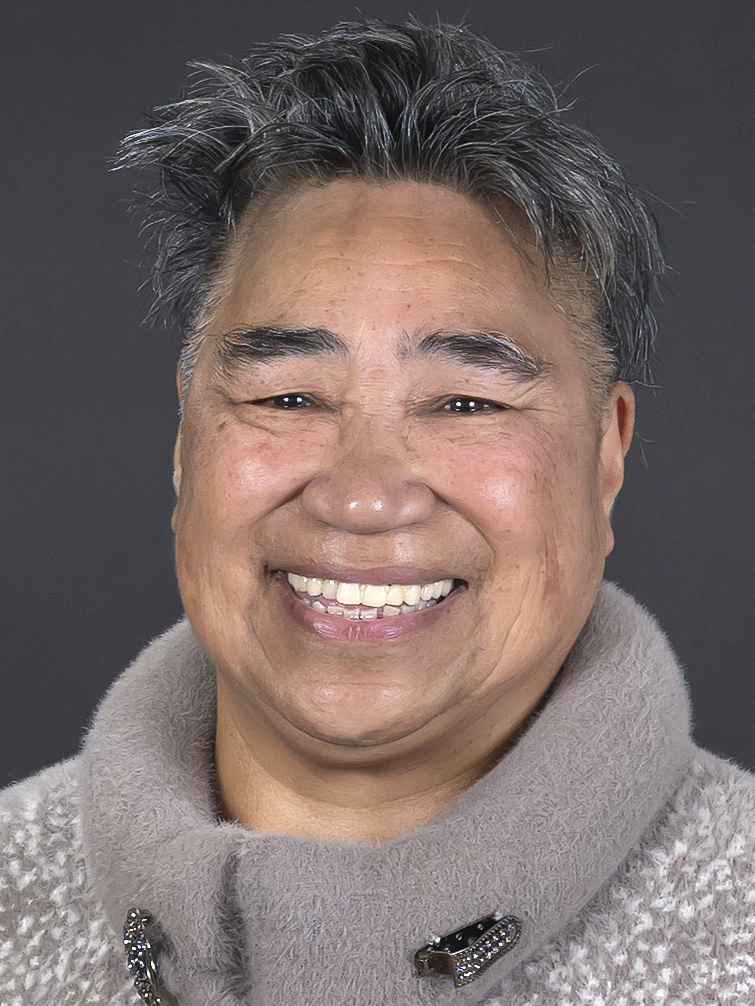
	Ind		Ind
Candidate	Sophie Barker	Andrew Simms	Lee Vandervis
Party	Independent	Future Dunedin	Independent
Primary vote	10,382	11,377	7,234
Percentage	23.98%	26.28%	16.71%
Final vote	16,874	15,976	excluded
Percentage	51.37%	48.63%
Candidate	Jules Radich	Marie Laufiso
Party	Independent	Building Kotahitaka
Primary vote	3,485	2,437
Percentage	8.05%	5.63%
Final vote	excluded	excluded
Mayor before election
Jules Radich
Team Dunedin
Elected mayor
Sophie Barker
Independent

The 2025 Dunedin mayoral election was a local election held from 9 September to 11 October in Dunedin, New Zealand, as part of that year's city council election and nation-wide local elections. Voters elected the mayor of Dunedin for the 2025–2028 term of the Dunedin City Council. Postal voting and the single transferable vote system were used.

Councillor Sophie Barker won the mayoralty, defeating incumbent mayor Jules Radich.

== Key dates ==
- 4 July 2025: Nominations for candidates opened
- 1 August 2025: Nominations for candidates closed at 12 pm
- 9 September 2025: Voting documents were posted and voting opened
- 11 October 2025: Voting closed at 12 pm and progress/preliminary results were published
- 16–19 October 2025: Final results were declared.

== Background ==
=== Electoral system ===
The election was held using the Single Transferable Vote system. Voting took place by post and through the returning of completed voting papers to ballot boxes.

== Campaign ==
One key election issue was the proposed landfill site at Smooth Hill. While the incumbent Mayor Jules Radich supported the Smooth Hill landfill site, mayoral candidate Andrew Simms and his Future Dunedin ticket opposed the new landfill site and campaigned on reversing the Council's decision to acquire the site for rubbish disposal.

== List of candidates ==
=== Declared candidates ===
Candidate	Photo	Affiliation	Notes
Lync Aronson		Independent-Fully Funded City Council	Also ran for council
Sophie Barker		Independent – working for you	City councillor since 2019, and former deputy mayor (2022–2023). Previously ran for mayor in 2022. Also ran for re-election as a councillor.
Doug Hall		None	Also ran for council
Carmen Houlahan		Independent	City councillor since 2019. Previously ran for mayor in 2022. Also ran for re-election as a councillor.
Marie Laufiso		Building Kotahitaka	Incumbent councillor since 2016. Also ran for re-election as a councillor.
Lianna MacFarlane		Independent	Hypnotherapist and life coach. Also ran to be a councillor.
Mandy Mayhem		None	City councillor since 2022. Previously ran for mayor in 2022. Also ran for re-election as a councillor.
David Milne		None	Previously ran for mayor in 2022. Also ran for council.
Flynn "Nisvett" Nisbett		Aotearoa New Zealand Silly Hat Party	Leader (king), Aotearoa New Zealand Silly Hat Party. Joke party candidate.
Benedict Ong		None	Former international banker. Also ran to be a councillor.
Jules Radich			Incumbent mayor since 2022
Zenith Rose-Wills (aka Ruthven Allimrac)		The Radical Action Faction	Climate activist and "vampire"
Andrew Simms		Future Dunedin	Businessman, Mosgiel-Taieri Community board chair, and leader of the Future Dunedin ticket. Also ran for council.
Pamela Taylor		Independent	Previously ran for the mayoralty in 2022. Also ran to be a councillor.
Mickey Treadwell		Green	Video game programmer and part-time lecturer. Also ran to be a councillor.
Lee Vandervis		Independent	City councillor since 2004 and perennial candidate. Previously ran for mayor in 2022. Also ran for re-election as a councillor.

=== Endorsements ===
On 17 June 2025, former Team Dunedin Councillors Andrew Whiley and Kevin Gilbert endorsed Sophie Barker as mayoral candidate. They along with fellow Team Dunedin councillor Brent Weatherall declined to endorse Jules Radich for a second term as Mayor of Dunedin.

== Results ==
When progress results were released on the afternoon after voting closed, it was clear that Dunedin would get a new mayor, but it was unclear who that was going to be. Radich, the incumbent, had come fourth. Sophie Barker had a slim margin of 105 votes over Andrew Simms, with Lee Vandervis in third place.

With the release of the preliminary results Sophie Barker was confirmed as the winner, having a clear lead of 726 votes over Andrew Simms. Final results increased this to 898.

2025 Dunedin mayoral election
Party	Candidate	Primary votes	%	±%	Iteration	
Party	Candidate	Primary votes	%	±%	#	Votes
Independent	Sophie Barker	10,382	23.98	+8.72	15th	16,874
Future Dunedin	Andrew Simms	11,377	26.27	(new)	15th	15,976
Independent	Lee Vandervis	7,234	16.71	+4.29	14th	8,739
Independent	Jules Radich^{†}	3,485	8.05	−27.65	13th	4,174
Building Kotahitaka	Marie Laufiso	2,437	5.63	(new)	12th	4,001
Green	Mickey Treadwell	1,967	4.54	(new)	11th	2,491
Independent	Mandy Mayhem	1,259	2.91	+0.66	10th	1,480
Independent	Benedict Ong	947	2.19	(new)	9th	1,248
Independent	Carmen Houlahan	758	1.75	−1.54	8th	1,017
Independent	Doug Hall	675	1.56	(new)	7th	797
Independent	Lync Aronson	657	1.52	(new)	6th	739
Independent	Lianna MacFarlane	422	0.97	(new)	5th	497
Independent	David Milne	344	0.79	−1.47	4th	360
Radical Action	Ruthven Allimrac	296	0.68	(new)	3rd	314
Independent	Pamela Taylor	149	0.34	−0.35	2nd	149
Silly Hat	Flynn (Nisvett) Nisbett	73	0.17	(new)	1st	73
Quota		21,231	49.03	−0.12		
Informal votes		106	0.24	+0.02		
Blank votes		727	1.68	+0.85		
Turnout		43,300	45.72	−4.18		
Registered electors		94,717				
Independent gain from Team Dunedin on 15th iteration						
^{†} incumbent

== See also ==
- 2025 Dunedin City Council election
- 2025 Otago Regional Council election
