= Team Dunedin =

Political party in Dunedin, New Zealand

- Leader: Jules Radich
- Founded: 12 October 2021; 4 years ago
- Dissolved: 2025
- Headquarters: 8 Jones Street, Dunedin
- Political position: Centre
- Colours: Blue, Yellow
- Slogan: "Welcoming, Vibrant, Sustainable"
- Seats on the Dunedin City Council: 0 / 15

Website
- www.teamdunedin.org.nz

Team Dunedin is a former local body ticket which contested local elections in Dunedin, New Zealand. Team Dunedin contested the 2022 Dunedin mayoral and City Council elections. The ticket's leader Jules Radich was elected as Mayor of Dunedin while Brent Weatherall, Andrew Whiley and Kevin Gilbert were elected as councillors.

Team Dunedin did not participate in the 2025 Dunedin mayoral and city council elections. Radich stood as an independent mayoral candidate while Whiley and Gilbert endorsed Cr Sophie Barker as a mayoral candidate.

== History ==
=== 2022 local elections ===
Team Dunedin was formed by Dunedin City councillor Jules Radich in October 2021 to contest the 2022 Dunedin mayoral and Dunedin City Council elections. Radich described the council's leadership by the progressive, Green Party mayor Aaron Hawkins as "autocratic" and overly influenced by party politics to the point of ignoring residents' interests. With Radich, incumbent councillors Andrew Whiley and Carmen Houlahan were founding members of the ticket.

Other members of Team Dunedin included business owner Brent Weatherall, 2020 ACT Party candidate Callum Steele-MacIntosh, Otago Peninsula Community Board member and school teacher Cheryl Neill, baker Kevin Gilbert, real estate investor and former council staffer Lynette Scott, and restaurant proprietor Riah McLean. Houlahan, who had been a founding member of Team Dunedin, withdrew in May 2022 to run against Radich for the mayoralty as an independent. McLean withdrew her candidacy on 5 July 2022, leaving Team Dunedin with seven candidates.

On 8 October, Radich was elected as Mayor of Dunedin, defeating Hawkins. Whiley, Weatherall and Gilbert were elected to the council. Neill was re-elected to the Otago Peninsula Community Board as an unaffiliated candidate.

=== 2025 local elections ===
On 17 June 2025, the Otago Daily Times reported that two Team Dunedin councillors Whiley and Gilbert had endorsed councillor Sophie Barker for the upcoming 2025 Dunedin mayoral election in October 2025. While Whiley and Gilbert had credited Team Dunedin with shifting the council's agenda away from the direction of the former Hawkins-led council, the two said that Dunedin need a long-term mayor with a "different skill set." Weatherall declined to endorse Radich as Mayor, saying that the electoral ticket failed due to a "lack of unity and numbers elected." Radich also confirmed that Team Dunedin would not be fielding candidates for the 2025 Dunedin City Council election but confirmed that he would be running for a second term as Mayor of Dunedin.

On 25 June 2025, councillor Bill Acklin accused Whiley and Gilbert of betraying Radich shortly after the 2022 local elections and interfering with the council's operations. In response to Acklin's allegations, Gilbert said that the Team Dunedin ticket "was never meant to function as if loyalty would be a key feature in office." Whiley cited disagreements with Radich's handling of the George Street redevelopment, attempted installation of a groyne at St Clair beach and remuneration dispute with Crs David Benson-Pope and Steve Walker as reasons for the breakdown in their relationship. In response, Radich supported Acklin's account of his deteriorating relationship with his Team Dunedin colleagues and defended his own leadership.

Radich, Weatherall, Whiley, and Gilbert contested councillor positions in the 2025 local elections as independent or unaffiliated candidates. Radich also stood for mayor. Radich was unseated as Mayor by incumbent councillor Sophie Barker but was re-elected to the Council as a councillor. While Weatherall was re-elected as a councillor, Whiley and Gilbert lost their seats.

== Leadership and policies ==
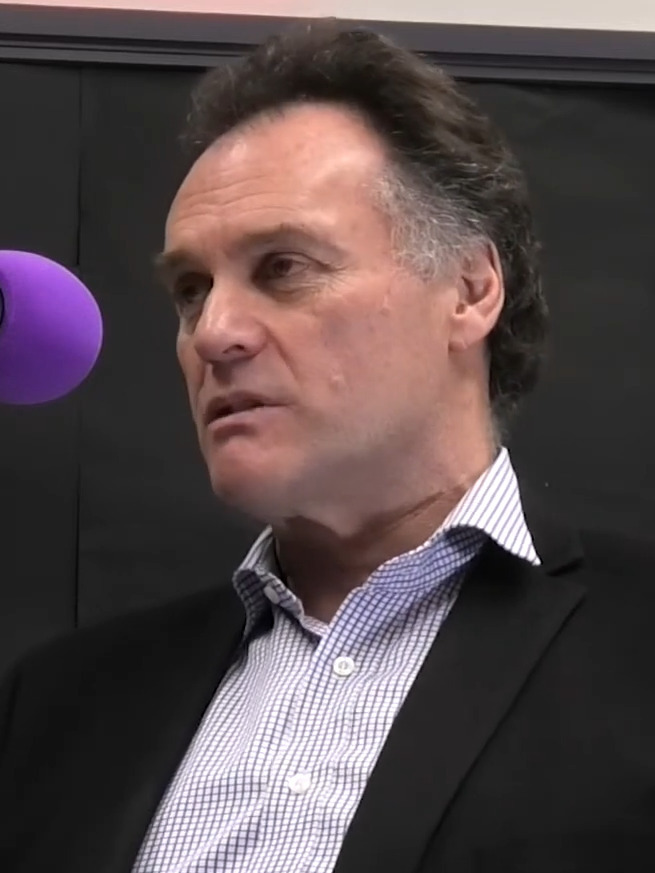
Radich in 2022

It was led by Dunedin city councillor and former mayor Jules Radich. Radich had described the ticket as centrist, encompassing ideas from both the left and right of politics.

Team Dunedin campaign material promoted policies such as using participatory democracy to make decisions (rather than representative democracy), ensuring older citizens' voices are heard in decision-making, expanding the network of tracks and trails in the city, upgrading existing playgrounds to have "destination" status, retaining the existing one-way system along State Highway 1, keeping Dunedin "open for business", protecting the Esplanade in St Clair, and conducting a safety audit of the city.

== Electoral results ==
Election	Candidates nominated		Seats won	
Election	Mayoral candidates	Council candidates	Mayoralty	Council seats
2022	1/11	7/40	1 / 1	3 / 14

=== 2022 Dunedin local elections ===
Candidate name	Position contested	Result of election
Jules Radich	Mayor	Elected
Brent Weatherall	Councillor	Elected
Andrew Whiley	Councillor	Elected
Kevin Gilbert	Councillor	Elected
Lynette Scott	Councillor	Not elected
Callum Steele	Councillor	Not elected
Cheryl May Neill	Councillor	Not elected
Jules Radich	Councillor	Withdrawn due to election as mayor
