= David Benson-Pope =

New Zealand politician

The Honourable David Benson-Pope
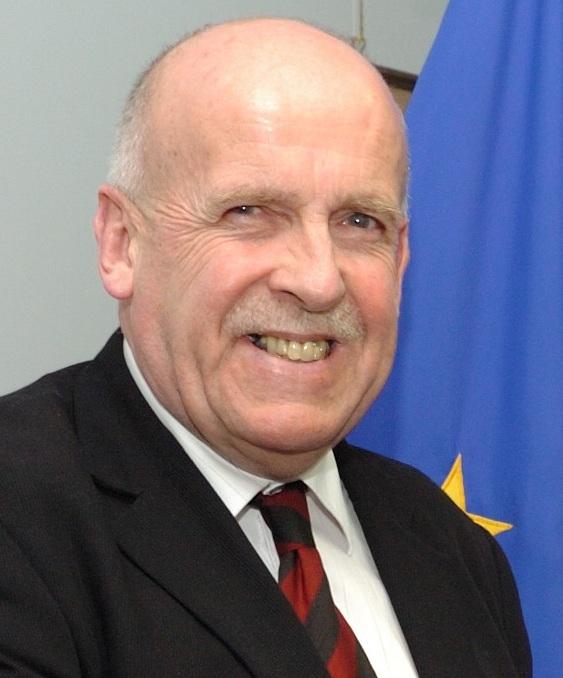
- Benson-Pope in 2006

12th Minister for the Environment
- In office 19 October 2005 – 27 July 2007
- Prime Minister: Helen Clark
- Preceded by: Marian Hobbs
- Succeeded by: David Parker (acting); Trevor Mallard

Member of the New Zealand Parliament for Dunedin South
- In office 1999–2008
- Preceded by: Dr Michael Cullen
- Succeeded by: Clare Curran
- Majority: 10,640 (30.27%)

Personal details
- Born: David Henry Benson-Pope; 23 February 1950 (age 76) St Kilda, New Zealand
- Party: Labour
- Spouse: Jan Flood
- Children: 2
- Occupation: Teacher

David Henry Benson-Pope (born 23 February 1950) is a New Zealand politician. He is a former Member of Parliament for Dunedin South from 1999 to 2008 and was Minister of Social Development and Minister for the Environment in the Fifth Labour Government from 2005 to 2007.

Benson-Pope previously served as a Dunedin city councillor from 1986 to 1999 and returned to local government for a second period from 2013 to 2025.

== Early career ==
Born in the Dunedin suburb of St Kilda on 23 February 1950, and educated at King's High School, Benson-Pope received his tertiary education at the University of Otago and Christchurch Teachers' College. While studying education he was president of the Students' Association at the college, and national president of the Student Teachers' Association of New Zealand.

Working as a teacher at Bayfield High School, where he taught German and outdoor education for 24 years, Benson-Pope became involved in the teachers' unions and was first elected to the Dunedin City Council on a Labour Party ticket in October 1986. He was re-elected to the city council four more times and resigned in 1999, after winning election to Parliament.

== Member of Parliament ==
New Zealand Parliament
Years	Term	Electorate	List	Party
1999–2002	46th	Dunedin South	54	Labour
2002–2005	47th	Dunedin South	36	Labour
2005–2008	48th	Dunedin South	23	Labour

Benson-Pope was selected to succeed Labour's deputy leader Michael Cullen as the Dunedin South candidate for the 1999 election when Cullen moved to Hawke's Bay. He easily defeated National candidate Russel Keast to retain the seat for Labour. During his first term, Benson-Pope was a member of the Local Government and Environment Committee, Regulations Review Committee and Education and Science Committee.

In 2002, Benson-Pope became his party's Senior Whip. He entered Cabinet in 2004, becoming Minister of Fisheries, Minister Responsible for the Law Commission, Associate Minister of Justice, Associate Minister for Education (Schools) and Associate Minister for the Environment. He oversaw the drafting of the legislation for civil unions in New Zealand and gained a reputation as a political "Mr Fixit" and "master of the dark art of politics," but was also known as "difficult to deal with."

Despite briefly losing his ministerial positions leading up to the 2005 general election due to allegations of misconduct during his teaching career, Benson-Pope was appointed Minister of Social Development and Employment and Minister for the Environment when that election returned the Fifth Labour Government of New Zealand for a third term. He lost those positions in 2007 and served the final year of his parliamentary career on the backbench. His committee assignments in 2007 and 2008 were as a member of the Law and Order Committee and Local Government and Environment Committee.

=== Allegations of misconduct as a teacher ===
Benson-Pope was temporarily stood down as a cabinet minister in 2005 after allegations from former students about the use of violence in the classroom. The allegations included stuffing a tennis ball in 14-year-old's mouth, throwing tennis balls at students to keep them quiet, striking a pupil with the back of his hand making the pupil's nose bleed at a school camp, and caning a student hard enough to draw blood. Benson-Pope denied the allegations. Claims that he misled Parliament were not referred to the Privileges Committee by the Speaker and after three weeks Benson-Pope was restored to his portfolios, except for his role as Associate Minister of Education.

Further claims about Benson-Pope's conduct as a teacher were revealed the following year. Investigate magazine published, in February 2006, allegations that he entered the girls' dormitory on a school camp to awaken students twice, and that he told them once that they were taking too long to shower after a "mud run." Benson-Pope denied any impropriety.

=== Allegations of misconduct as Minister for the Environment ===
Benson-Pope faced further controversy in 2007, which led to the resignation of his ministerial posts and the end of his Parliamentary career.

In July 2007 it emerged that a political advisor in Benson-Pope's office (the Labour Party's Trade Union Affiliate Vice-President Steve Hurring) made phone calls which led to the sacking of the Ministry for the Environment's newly appointed communications manager. The issue revolved around her relationship with the chief press secretary to National's parliamentary leader John Key, despite the fact that she had "made a disclosure of her personal connections" during the appointment process. (Under New Zealand's State Sector Act 1988, ministers and their staff were prohibited from being involved in employment matters within government departments for which they are responsible. The Act requires the chief executives of those departments "to act independently of Ministers in matters relating to decisions on individual employees.")

After a week of intense pressure focusing not only on the allegation that his staff had acted improperly, but also that he himself had misled Parliament, the media and Prime Minister Helen Clark about his knowledge and involvement, Benson-Pope offered his resignation from Cabinet at noon on Friday 27 July 2007. Clark accepted the resignation, saying, "The way in which certain issues have been handled this week has led to a loss of credibility and on that basis I have accepted Mr Benson-Pope's offer to stand aside". An editorial commented, "Not for the first time, he and the Government have been embarrassed less for what he has done than for his inability to simply say what he has done."

Despite subsequent investigations by State Services Commissioner Mark Prebble and former State Services Commissioner Don Hunn found that neither the Minister nor his staff acted in any way inappropriately, Benson-Pope remained a backbencher for the remainder of the parliamentary term. His resignation triggered a significant reshuffle of the Cabinet. Although Clark indicated that Benson-Pope could be returned to Cabinet at a later time, he was not reselected as the Labour Party candidate for his electorate at the 2008 general election (which, in any event, Labour lost), and left Parliament.

== Local government career ==
After losing his bid to remain Labour's Dunedin South candidate for the 2008 general election, Benson-Pope rejected an invitation to stand for the Aotearoa Legalise Cannabis Party and did not stand as an independent candidate.

Returning to Dunedin, Benson-Pope worked as a resource consent hearings commissioner and sought election to the Dunedin City Council (DCC) in the 2013 local body elections. He stood as an independent candidate and was elected on 12 October 2013. He was re-elected in 2016, 2019 and 2022. He was a senior member of the DCC under mayors Dave Cull and Aaron Hawkins and chaired the council's planning and regulatory committee from 2013 until 2022.

During a live-streamed Zoom meeting of the DCC held on 5 May 2020, Benson-Pope was seen in the camera of his computer cleaning his study with a feather duster whilst "pants-less". Members of the public, councillors and senior managers watched on as the meeting faced technological difficulties. Benson-Pope said he was not wearing pants but was wearing shorts after gardening earlier in the day and stated he was "delighted" that his cameo provided a welcome diversion but "it wasn't intentional."

Benson-Pope was re-elected to the Dunedin City Council for a fourth term during the 2022 Dunedin local elections. He was not given a chair or deputy chair role within the Dunedin City Council by the new Mayor of Dunedin Jules Radich. Benson-Pope and Walker claimed that Radich had offered them committee roles which he knew they would reject. The mayor's proposed councillor salaries included an 11.7% pay cut for councillors without leadership roles than the equivalent position received in the previous term. In late October, Benson-Pope supported an unsuccessful motion by Green councillor Marie Laufiso to close the pay gap between councillors assigned deputy chair roles and those without these duties. The motion was defeated by a margin of 11 to 4 votes. In December 2022, the DCC was required to consider a revised remuneration proposal after the Remuneration Authority determined the paycut was unlawful.

In mid December 2022, Benson-Pope voiced opposition to Health New Zealand's proposed budgetary cutbacks to operating theatres and facilities in plans for the rebuilt Dunedin Hospital, Dunedin's primary hospital. He also campaigned for the Hospital to be rebuilt according to its original specifications. In late January, Benson-Pope filed a motion urging the DCC to contribute NZ$130,400 for a public campaign to support the hospital rebuild project as it was outlined in the final business case. On 31 January, the DCC voted unanimously to support Benson-Pope's motion to fight changes to the Dunedin Hospital's design.

In May 2024, Benson-Pope and fellow councillor Sophie Barker criticised Mayor Radich for not holding regular statutory chief executive appraisal committee meetings. The last such committee meeting was held on 8 September 2023. Benson-Pope claimed that Radich's failure to hold regular meetings "was symptomatic of him having none of the skills required to perform this role." Radich disputed the councillors' criticisms, saying that Benson-Pope was not a member of the appraisal committee and argued that the DCC had held regular meetings.

In late May 2024, Benson-Pope voted in favour of a DCC motion asking the New Zealand government to establish a special visa category for Palestinian refugees displaced by the Gaza war. He said that "what's different here is we've got local residents asking us to get their families out of a hellish situation. Anyone who doesn't support that doesn't deserve to be sitting here."

In late September 2024, Benson-Pope voted in favour of the DCC retaining ownership of utility company Aurora Energy following strong public opposition to the proposed sale. He said "I think, especially for those of you in the room today, that you will already have realised that had that public voice not been so clearly articulated, the decision would have been very, very different."

On 26 August 2025, Benson Pope voted against a DCC motion to scrap the contentious Albany Street connection, which passed by a vote of 8 to 7 votes. The street connection had involved installing a cycleway and removing 48 carparks near the University of Otago. Local business owners had criticised the DCC for not consulting them about the proposed project. Mayor Jules Radich has used his casting vote to pass the motion after Cr Jim O'Malley recused himself from the proceedings. Benson Pope supported the cycleway project, describing it as a "no-brainer" given that a significant amount of work had already been completed. That same day, he voted in favour of a motion to scrap free Sunday parking in the Dunedin city centre, which passed by a vote of 11 to 4.

In late September 2025, Benson-Pope supported a motion by Cr Christine Garey to revoke the Council's decision to cancel the Albany Street connection, which passed by a margin of 8 to 7 votes. He thanked Garey for the motion of revocation, describing the previous decision as a "gross error."

Benson-Pope retired from the council at the 2025 local elections.

== Personal life ==
Benson-Pope is married with twin children. His son Henry Benson-Pope is a senior Crown prosecutor and part-time lecturer at the University of Otago.

Political offices
Preceded by Marian Hobbs	Minister for the Environment; 2005–2007	Succeeded by Trevor Mallard (after David Parker as Acting Minister)
New Zealand Parliament
Preceded by Dr Michael Cullen	Member of Parliament for Dunedin South; 1999–2008	Succeeded by Clare Curran
Party political offices
Preceded by Rick Barker	Senior Whip of the Labour Party; 2002–2004	Succeeded by Jill Pettis
