= Jules Radich =

New Zealand politician (1954–2026)

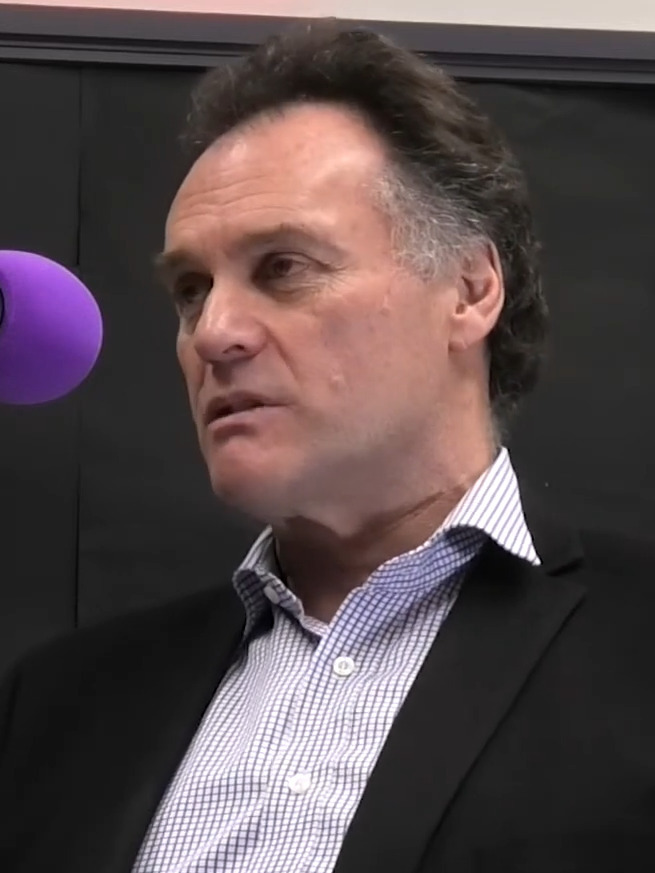
- Radich in 2019

59th Mayor of Dunedin
- In office 8 October 2022 – 16 October 2025
- Deputy: Sophie Barker; Cherry Lucas
- Preceded by: Aaron Hawkins
- Succeeded by: Sophie Barker

Personal details
- Born: Jules Vincent Radich; 19 January 1954 Mataura, New Zealand
- Died: 4 January 2026 (aged 71) Dunedin, New Zealand
- Party: Team Dunedin (2022–2025) Independent (2025–2026)
- Education: University of Otago

Jules Vincent Radich (19 January 1954 – 4 January 2026) was a New Zealand politician. He served as the 59th mayor of Dunedin from 2022 to 2025.

== Early life and education ==
Radich was born in Mataura on 19 January 1954. He claimed Scottish, Māori, Irish and Croatian ancestry. Radich moved to Dunedin to study for a Bachelor of Science at the University of Otago. He taught science and physics at Tamatea High School, Napier.

== Business career ==
Radich started Uptown Motorcycles in Dunedin, and after 20 years, sold the company. Radich was a manager and director of the Golden Centre Mall and was a company director for Action Coach Otago and was a business coach for 14 years.

He was a founding member of Orokonui Ecosanctuary. He was also a member of the Dunedin Art Society, Wine & Food Society, Investors Club, Underwater Hockey Club, Otago Motorcycle Club and Forest & Bird.

== Local government career ==
=== First term, 2019–2022 ===
Radich contested the 2019 Dunedin mayoral election and also ran for a position on the city council. While he was unsuccessful in the mayoralty, he was elected as a councillor. Radich presented pro-business views on the council, in contrast to the Green Party-aligned mayor Aaron Hawkins. In his first term, he was appointed deputy chair of the infrastructure services committee.

Before and following his election as a councillor, Radich advocated for the reinstatement of wooden groynes at St Clair Beach, which had been removed by storm activity in the 2010s. On 10 December 2019, the council agreed with a motion proposed by Radich to request a staff report on assessing options for reinstating the existing timber groyne. In 2020, a vote to consult the community on reinstating the groyne was lost.

=== 2022 mayoral election ===
Radich served his first term as a councillor on the Dunedin City Council (DCC) between 2019 and 2022. During the 2022 Dunedin mayoral election, he stood as a mayoral candidate on the Team Dunedin electoral ticket. During the election, Radich campaigned on reducing debt levels and restoring local confidence. On 8 October 2022, Radich defeated incumbent Mayor of Dunedin Aaron Hawkins.

=== Mayor of Dunedin, 2022–2025 ===
Following his election as mayor, Radich confirmed several policy positions including launching a review of the George Street revamp, retaining the city's one-way traffic system and investing in infrastructure to deal with stormwater inundation.

==== Governance and leadership ====
In mid October 2022, Radich made his first round of mayoral appointments, including the appointment of Sophie Barker as deputy mayor. Radich appointed councillors to a range of committee chair and deputy chair roles, stating that his goal was to "create an environment where all councillors' skills and strengths are harnessed and their voices heard, and to lead a united council for the benefit of the city." Senior councillor and former Labour Member of Parliament David Benson-Pope and Labour councillor Steve Walker were not appointed to any committee chair or deputy chair roles; they claimed they were offered roles that Radich knew they would reject.

A pay dispute with Benson-Pope and Walker followed. Breaking with tradition, Radich had proposed paying councillors serving as chairs and deputy chairs more than councillors without additional responsibilities; with deputy chairs earning NZ$80,442 and other councillors earning NZ$64,353 per annum. In response to criticism, Radich rejected claims that his actions were political and claimed that they reflected the difference in work he expected from councillors holding additional responsibilities. In mid-December 2022, the Remuneration Authority, an independent statutory body, rejected Radich's proposal to cut Benson Pope and Walker's salary by 11.7 percent on the grounds that it was unlawful. In mid-December, the council reduced the salaries of the deputy mayor and deputy chair by NZ$2,144 and NZ$2,460 while raising Walker and Benson-Pope's salary by $8,430 each, bringing their annual remuneration to $72,783.

Radich was criticised for his handling of a code of conduct breach involving Barry Williams, the chair of the council's Strath Taieri community board, in September 2023. Williams had racially abused a non-white staff member at the Strath Taieri Hotel in Middlemarch following a mistake with a food order. While the council had wanted Williams to resign from his position, Radich decided not to take further disciplinary action against Williams after the latter apologised, stating during a Radio New Zealand interview that "it happened in a pub, and he [Williams] didn't even remember that it had happened, so it was just a relatively minor thing." In response, the deputy mayor Sophie Barker and councillor Jim O'Malley filed a code of conduct complaint against Radich over his handling the incident. Barker also resigned as deputy mayor; Radich replaced her with first-term councillor Cherry Lucas.

The council initiated an independent investigation into Radich's conduct, which reported back in December 2023 that Radich had breached the council's code of conduct and brought the council into disrepute. Radich publicly apologised for his behaviour. In addition, the investigation found that councillor Carmen Houlahan had breached the council's code of conduct by harrying Barker and O'Malley over their complaint against Radich.

On 22 May 2024, Radich was criticised by councillors David Benson-Pope and Sophie Barker for not holding regular chief executive appraisal committee meetings. The last such committee meeting was held on 8 September 2023. Radich disputed the criticism, arguing that the DCC had held regular meetings.

===== Rates rises =====
On 12 March 2024, Radich supported a Dunedin City Council (DCC) proposal to raise rates by 17.5% in order to fund the Council's operations and works. He disagreed with budgets cuts and opposed deferring work on water and wastewater infrastructure. Radich said that "pipes and plumbing are out of sight, and the price of maintenance can seem too much. Now that a survey of our network has been completed, it is apparent that extensive expenditure is required." The DCC voted by a margin of 13–1 to adopt draft operating budgets for the purpose of community engagement. The sole dissenter was Councillor Lee Vandervis, who objected to increasing the Council's debt.

In early May 2024, Radich ranked a low +1% in polling agency Curia Research's nationwide poll of New Zealand mayors over the past several months. Radich attributed his low ranking to public dissatisfaction with increasing rates and debt levels in Dunedin, saying "I'm working hard to put Dunedin's finances on a more sustainable path, but it's certainly not fun. The difficult decisions fall to me and the councillors."

On 24 January 2025, Radich unveiled a draft nine-year plan to reduce rates by 6%. This plan involves renewing core infrastructure while removing certain projects and modifying others. In an effort to reduce rates, saving would also be made in response to rising construction, maintenance and insurance costs. In mid February 2025, Radich reiterated the DCC's plans to slow rising debt and to pay off the city's debts within a decade.

=== Advocacy and policies as mayor ===
==== Three Waters and co-governance ====
In early November 2022, Radich expressed conditional support for the Government's controversial Three Waters reform programme but advocated more local ownership over water resources and infrastructure. While supporting national water regulation, Radich argued that the administration of water in the Otago and Southland Regions should be done at the regional level rather than through an entity covering the entire South Island. On 9 November, Radich and all DCC councillors with the exception of Vandervis voted to sign an updated agreement with the two local mana whenua (tribal groups) Kati Huirapa Rūnaka ki Puketeraki and Te Rūnanga ō Ōtākou.

==== Dunedin Hospital ====
In December 2022, Radich initially supported Te Whatu Ora's (Health New Zealand) cutbacks to operating facilities at the new Dunedin Hospital. By January 2023, Radich had revised his position in the face of opposition from the public and fellow Dunedin City councillors including Benson-Pope to the proposed hospital rebuild cutbacks. Radich argued that opposing Health NZ's proposed hospital cutbacks could help improve public opinion ratings of the Dunedin City Council, which had declined to a record 25 percent low in 2022. In late January, Radich seconded Benson-Pope's motion urging the DCC to contribute NZ$130,400 for a public campaign to support the hospital rebuild project as it was outlined in the final business case. On 31 January, the DCC including Radich voted unanimously to support Benson-Pope's motion to fight changes to the Dunedin Hospital's design.

In early September 2024, Radich criticised a proposal by the Sixth National Government to cut the number of emergency beds and downgrading operating theatres as part of cost-cutting measures, saying that any reduction of facilities and services were contrary to the Government's promises made to Dunedin, Otago and Southland residents. Earlier in June 2024, Health Minister Shane Reti had reiterated the National-led government's commitment to its 2023 election promise of restoring previously cut beds, operating theatres and equipment at the new Dunedin Hospital. On 6 September 2024, Radich and the DCC called on the Government to rebuild Dunedin hospital without clinical cuts.

In mid-September 2024, Radich and New Zealand Nurses' Organisation delegate Linda Smillie met with Health Minister Reti to present a 23,000 strong petition opposing the proposed cuts to the New Dunedin Hospital. On 19 September, Mayor Radich and the Dunedin City Council launched the "Hospital Cuts Hurt" campaign to opposed clinical cuts to the hospital rebuilt including a protest march on 28 September. On 27 September, Radich objected to the Government's announcement that it was exploring ways to scale back the new Dunedin hospital construction. The DCC's Hospital Cuts Hurt campaign attracted the support of the opposition Labour Party, Mayor of Invercargill Nobby Clark and Mayor of Waitaki Gary Kircher. The campaign culminated in a 34,000-strong petition being delivered to Parliament on 5 November 2024.

On 31 January 2025, Radich welcomed Health Minister Simeon Brown's announcement that the Government would build the new Dunedin Hospital on the site of the former Cadbury factory rather than refurbishing the existing hospital. Radich credited the "Hospital Cut Hurts" campaign with forcing the Government to listen to public demands for a new hospital. Radich also thanked the Government for listening to public feedback.

==== Israel-Palestine conflict ====
In late May 2024, Radich and a majority of the Dunedin City Council (DCC) adopted a motion urging the New Zealand government to create special visas for Palestinian refugees by a margin of 14 to one votes in response to the Gaza war. Radich said that he did not see this motion as "one of aggression or blame. It's one of safety... it's on the side of humanity."

In early July 2025, Radich was criticised by Crs Marie Laufiso, Christine Garey, Mandy Mayhem, Steve Walker and David Benson-Pope for the nature of a DCC letter sent to the New Zealand Parliament's community services committee meeting considering Green Party co-leader Chlöe Swarbrick's proposed "Unlawful Occupation of Palestine Sanctions Bill." While the letter expressed the DCC's support for Swarbrick's member's bill, it controversially outlined the Council's split 7–7 vote on the motion. By contrast, Crs Bill Acklin, Andrew Whiley and Lee Vandervis defended the letter as a reflection of the DCC's split voting on the issue.

==== Aurora Energy ====
In mid March 2024, Radich supported a DCC proposal to consult ratepayers on a proposal to sell the Council-owned power company Aurora Energy in order to pay off the company's forecast debt of NZ$750 million. Radich said that the money would be invested in an investment fund to generate revenue for the DCC. The Council voted by a margin of 13–1 to consult the public on Aurora Energy's sale proposal.

In late September 2024, Radich and a majority of DCC councillors voted in favour of retaining energy company Aurora Energy following strong public opposition to its proposal sale. While describing Aurora as a "cash hungry beast", he described the company as a good long-term investment since the cash it was consuming would increase the company's value and help fund infrastructure building and growth. In early July 2025, Radich suggested that Aurora Energy could have been sold for NZ$1.9 billion if market conditions had been favourable.

==== Albany Street connection ====
In June 2025, Radich expressed concerns by nearby business owners about inadequate consultation regarding the redevelopment of Albany Street in Central Dunedin, also suggested that DCC staff had an anti-car agenda. Fellow councillors Jim O'Malley, Steve Walker and Christine Barry accused the Mayor of undermining Council staff. Cr Lee Vandervis expressed concerned that elected councillors had not seen the final version of the plan. In response, On 24 January 2025, climate and city growth general manager Scott MacLean defended the consultation process, stating that the affected parties had contributed input to the final design. Work on the Albany Street connection is expected to commence in November 2025 and conclude by May 2026.

On 26 August 2025, Radich used his casting vote to axe the contentious Albany Street connection, which passed by a vote of 8 to 7 votes. The street connection had involved installing a cycleway and removing 48 carparks near the University of Otago. Local business owners had criticised the DCC for not consulting them on the scale, scope and timing of the proposed project. Cr Jim O'Malley, who had recused himself from the motion following criticism of his interaction with local business owners, called for Radich to recuse himself, claiming that the Mayor's public statements criticising the consultation exposed the council to judicial review. DCC legal adviser Michael Garbett said that Radich's comments were focusing on council procedure and did not constitute a conflict of interest. That same day, Radich voted in favour of a motion to scrap free Sunday parking in the Dunedin city centre, which passed by a vote of 11 to 4.

On 23 September 2025, Radich unsuccessfully voted against Cr Christine Garey's motion to revoke the Council's decision to cancel the Albany Street connection, which passed by a margin of eight to seven votes. In response, Radich said that the "needs of the majority were being overlooked to suit a minority."

=== 2025 mayoral election ===
In mid October 2024, Radich confirmed that he would be running for a second term as mayor at the 2025 Dunedin mayoral election, scheduled to be held between 9 September and 11 October 2025.

In mid-June 2025, Radich's former Team Dunedin colleagues Crs Andrew Whiley, Kevin Gilbert and Brent Weatherall declined to endorse Radich for a second term as Mayor of Dunedin. Whiley and Gilbert instead endorsed Cr Sophie Barker as a mayoral candidate. In late June 2025, Cr Bill Acklin accused Whiley and Gilbert of betraying Radich shortly after the 2022 local elections and interfering with the Council's operations. In response to Acklin's allegations, Gilbert said that Team Dunedin "was never meant to function as if loyalty would be a key feature in office." Whiley cited disagreements with Radich's handling of the George Street redevelopment, attempted installation of a groyne at St Clair beach and remuneration dispute with Crs David Benson-Pope and Steve Walker as reasons for the breakdown in their professional relationship. In response, Radich backed Acklin's account and defended his leadership.

During the 2025 Dunedin mayoral election held on 11 October, Radich came in fourth place and was succeeded as Mayor by Sophie Barker. He also contested the 2025 Dunedin City Council election and was re-elected as a councillor. Radich credited the establishment of a water services delivery plan and the Council's decision to build a new landfill at Smooth Hill as key achievements during his mayoral term.

=== Final term, 2025–2026 ===
In early November 2025, Mayor Barker appointed Radich as the chairman of the infrastructure portfolio. On 12 November, Radich unsuccessfully opposed a council motion to accept a budget overspend on the contentious Albany Street Connection Project, which passed by a margin of 8 to 7 votes. Prior to the 2025 local elections, the DCC had initially voted to cancel the project before rescinding the cancellation.

In late November 2025, Radich along with fellows Crs Andrew Simms, John Chambers, Lee Vandervis, Russell Lund and Doug Hall met with residents of Surrey Street to raise awareness of sewage overflows during flooding. The meeting was organised by Simms, who was critical of the Council's response to the street's sewage problems.

== Personal life and death ==
Radich lived in St Clair, Dunedin. He was married to Pamela and had two children.

On 4 January 2026, Radich died at Dunedin Hospital, after suffering a heart attack the previous day. He was 71. Radich's funeral was held at the First Church of Otago on 9 January.

Political offices
Preceded by Aaron Hawkins	Mayor of Dunedin; 2022–2025	Succeeded by Sophie Barker
