= Future Dunedin =

Political party in Dunedin, New Zealand

- Leader: Andrew Simms
- Founded: 2025
- Ideology: Localism
- Colours: Dark Blue

Website
- futuredunedin.nz

Future Dunedin is a local body ticket that was established by motor businessman Andrew Simms and businesswoman Rebecca Twemlow to contest the 2025 Dunedin mayoral and City Council elections.

== Leadership and policies ==
Future Dunedin is led by Dunedin businessman and Mosgiel-Taieri Community Board chairman Andrew Simms and businesswoman and Business South director Rebecca Twemlow. While the ticket body has a core set of beliefs, Simms said that Future Dunedin was not a voting bloc and that members would be allowed vote differently on "certain issues."

The group's policies have included:

- Reducing forecast rates and council borrowing.
- Reviewing council budgets, contracts, council-controlled organisations and limiting spending until the council achieves a surplus.
- Restoring trust in the DCC by reducing the number of non-public meetings, non-public workshops and confidential reports.
- Fostering economic growth by releasing industrial land for business use, encouraging public-private partnerships, and promoting Dunedin more actively in tourism and economic forums.
- Giving community boards greater decision-making powers and access to DCC resources.
- Treating South Dunedin as a priority area by supporting upgrades to stormwater systems and implementing the recommendations of earlier reports.
- Environmental measures: Supporting practical steps to reduce carbon emissions, protect waterways and the harbour from contaminants, contribute to predator-free initiatives, and strengthen coastal defences against climate impacts.
- Upholding the Treaty of Waitangi through partnerships with local Māori mana whenua.
- Enacting policies to promote heritage sites in Dunedin.
- Promoting the economic potential of Forsyth Barr Stadium including greater community usage.
- Adopting policies to end "unsheltered homelessness" in Dunedin.
- Supporting Dunedin Railways to operate the Taieri Gorge Railway until 2027.
- Opposing the Smooth Hill landfill project, citing both cost and environmental risks, and support investigating alternative waste management options.
- Exploring the establishment of commuter rail services between Port Chalmers, Dunedin and Mosgiel.

== History ==
On 29 January 2025, Simms confirmed that he would be contesting the 2025 Dunedin mayoral election and would also be establishing a Future Dunedin ticket to contest the 2025 Dunedin City Council election. Simms had opposed the Dunedin City Council's unsuccessful 2024 proposal to sell the Aurora Energy utility company. Simms said that he established Future Dunedin in response to the proposed Aurora Energy asset sale. Simms announced Firebrand founder and marketing director Rebecca Twemlow as a fellow Future Dunedin candidate, with plans to recruit further candidates. Simms has expressed disagreement with the Dunedin City Council's perceived "lack of vision, direction and leadership."

By 17 March 2025, Simms confirmed that Future Dunedin had recruited seven candidates including himself, Twemlow, West Harbour Community Board member Jarrod Hodson, lawyer Rachel Brazil, former Dunedin city councillor Conrad Stedman, University of Otago marketing senior lecturer Dr Robert Hamlin and volunteer and disability advocate Dr Amy Taylor. Simms said that the group would focus on increasing community decision-making and curbing what he regarded as "unsustainable" rate increases. According to the group's website, these candidates came from Dunedin's business, tourism, education and vulnerable services sectors.

On 21 March 2025, Simms removed Hamlin as a Future Dunedin candidate after he circulated an email criticising the use of karakia (Māori prayers) at university meetings. In removing Hamlin, Simms reiterated Future Dunedin's support for mana whenua and the use of karakia, stating "We can only assume that Dr Hamlin's objection to karakia would cross over to our group, and really there's no place for that in our group." In response, Hamlin defended his remarks about karakia and said that his departure from the ticket was "not by mutual agreement." Hamlin subsequently announced in early August 2025 that he would be contesting the 2025 Dunedin City Council election as an independent candidate.

In early May 2025, Future Dunedin released an advertisement in the Otago Daily Times opposing a proposed landfill site at Smooth Hill. Developer Allan Dippie accused the advertisement of presenting "wild, alarmist, extremist things" and alleged that Simms and Future Dunedin were trying to be populist. During a Dunedin City Council meeting, Simms defended his position on the proposed landfill, saying it had "been developed alongside logistics experts, accountants, environmental experts, commercial waste operators and two landfill operators."

In late June 2025, Simms expressed disagreement with the idea of unelected Māori mana whenua representatives having voting rights in DCC proceedings, stating "I see the inclusion of unelected representatives at any level having a vote as being the thin end of the wedge a bit and I don't think that fits with democracy. At that point, the community loses control of who they have to represent them." Simms added that experts could participate in Council discussions but should not having voting rights since they were unelected. He told the Otago Daily Times that Future Dunedin candidates were free to form their opinions on Māori wards and constituencies and mana whenua representatives' voting rights, which he described as conscience issues. After consulting with fellow Future Dunedin candidates, Simms reversed his initial position on opposing unelected representatives having voting rights in DCC proceedings, stating that he supported mana whenua having some form of representation on the DCC.

On 20 August 2025, Future Dunedin candidate Rachel Brazil withdrew from the Future Dunedin ticket after facing criticism for sharing a leaked, confidential report about DCC chief executive Sandy Graham, which is considered a breach of the Privacy Act. Brazil said she still endorsed Simms as Mayoral candidate but said she had left Future Dunedin to avoid negative public perceptions affecting the group's electoral performance.

In mid August 2025, Future Dunedin co-founder candidate Bex Twemlow was criticised by Unite Union Dunedin organiser Andrew Tate after she made remarks suggesting that striking McDonald's fast food workers could be replaced by automation. In response to criticism, Twemlow denied that she was dismissing workers' rights or unions but objected to the alleged demonisation of McDonald's and other local employers. On 25 August, Future Dunedin candidate Jo Galer withdrew from the ticket and announced she would be standing as an independent candidate. Galer alleged that Twemlow was dominating the group and that other members were questioning their allegiance. In response, Twemlow accused Galer of focusing solely on heritage issues while Simms expressed relief that Galer had left the ticket prior to the election.

During the 2025 Dunedin mayoral election which concluded on 11 October, Simms came second place to mayoral elect Sophie Barker based on progress results, gaining 12,782 votes. Based on progress results, Simms and Future Dunedin candidate Bruce Ranga were elected to the Dunedin City Council. Following the release of preliminary results on 12 October, Ranga fell short of the numbers needed to be elected onto the City Council, leaving Simms as the sole Future Dunedin councillor. In mid-December 2025, the Otago Daily Times reported that Simms had spent NZ$45,000 on his mayoral and city council campaign, and also contributed over NZ$70,000 to covering his fellow Future Dunedin candidates' campaigns. While Simms' mayoral bid and fellow Future Dunedin candidates were unsuccessful, he credited the campaign with boosting his personal profile and car business sales.

== Electoral results ==
Election	Candidates nominated		Seats won	
Election	Mayoral candidates	Council candidates	Mayoralty	Council seats
2025	1/16	7/54	0 / 1	1 / 14

=== 2025 Dunedin local elections ===
Candidate name	Position contested	Result of election
Andrew Simms	Councillor	Elected
Bruce Ranga	Councillor	Not elected
Conrad Stedman	Councillor	Not elected
Rachel Brazil	Councillor	Not elected
Jo Galer	Councillor	Not elected
Rebecca (Bex) Twemlow	Councillor	Not elected
Andrew Sutton	Councillor	Not elected
Jarrod Hodson	Councillor	Not elected
Amy Taylor	Councillor	Not elected
