= Marie Laufiso =

New Zealand local government politician

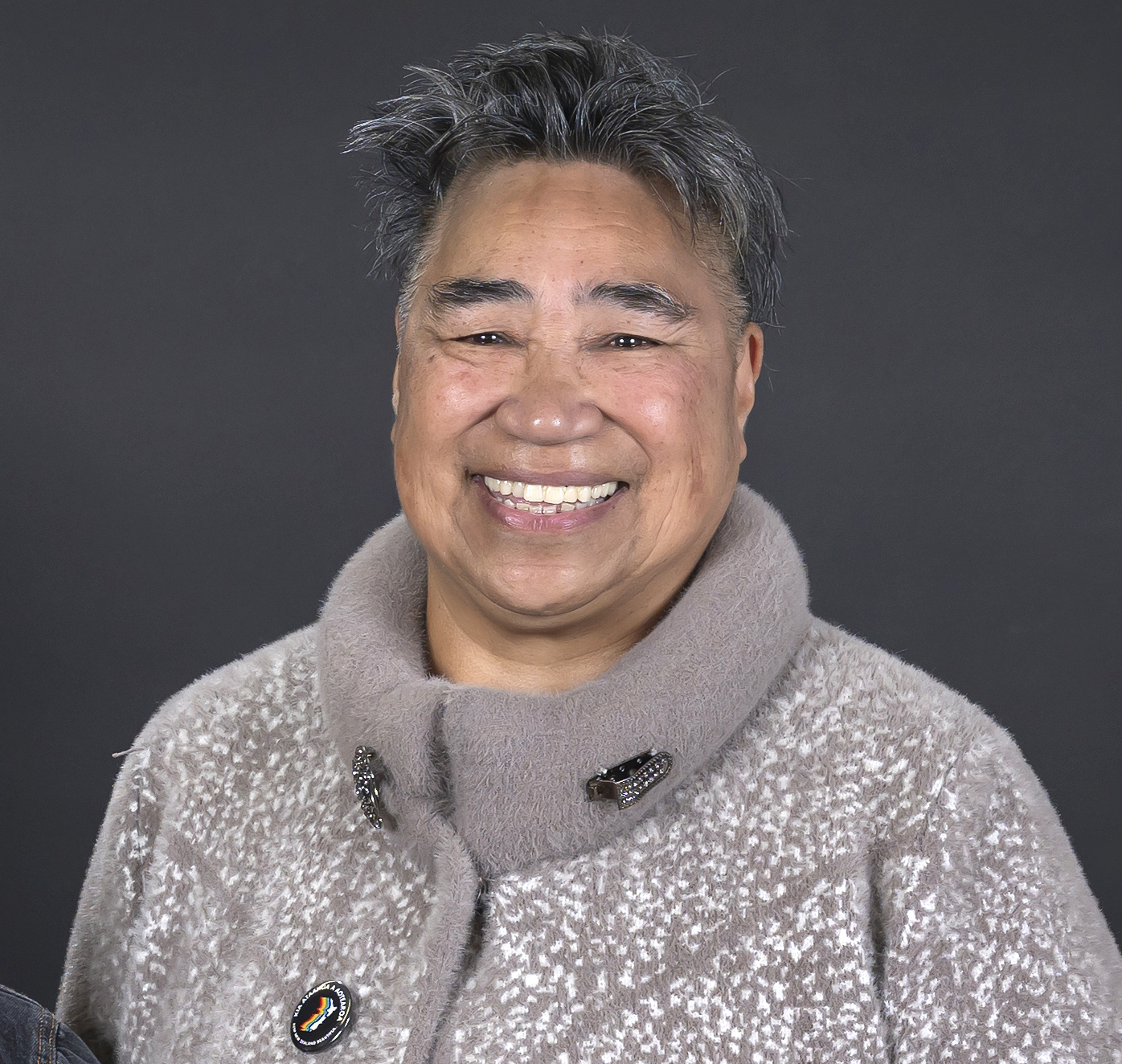
- Born: Dunedin, New Zealand
- Occupation: local government politician
- Organization: Dunedin City Council
- Known for: activism and advocacy
- Relatives: Agnes (Eti) Ivala (mother); Mikaele Laufiso (father); Phillippa Laufiso (sister)

Marie Laufiso is a local government politician in Dunedin, New Zealand. Laufiso is currently serving her third term as councillor for the Dunedin City Council, having initially been elected in 2016, and is currently chair of its community services committee.

== Family ==
Marie Laufiso was born in Dunedin and raised in Brockville where four generations of her family still live. Her pepeha acknowledges (among others) parents Mikaele Laufiso and the late Agnes (Eti) Ivala and sister Phillippa Laufiso.

== Activism ==
In 2012, Laufiso was appointed a community development co-ordinator for Brockville where she aimed to "put her background in community work and activism to good use." She helped establish a community orchard and campaigned for lower fares on Dunedin's buses.

== Green Party, 2016–2024 ==
In July 2016 Laufiso announced that she, along with Aaron Hawkins, would stand as a Green Party of Aotearoa New Zealand candidate in the 2016 city council election

When elected to the city council in October 2016, Laufiso became Dunedin’s first Pasifika city councillor and the Green Party's first successful Pasifika election candidate at either local or central government level; Laufiso is of Sāmoan and Tongan descent.

In her first term as councillor, Laufiso campaigned against oil and gas exploration near the city, the proposed closure of the city's Cadbury chocolate factory and the naming of a Mosgiel street after coloniser Edward Gibbon Wakefield.

Laufiso was re-elected in 2019, as colleague Hawkins became the first Green Mayor of Dunedin. She was highly critical of a controversial cartoon by Garrick Tremain in the Otago Daily Times which made light of the 2019 Samoa measles outbreak. In 2022, Laufiso said she had deleted her Facebook account, stating Facebook’s algorithms escalate "anxiety and fear and hatred".

In her third term from October 2022, Laufiso became sole Green councillor as Hawkins lost the mayoralty to Jules Radich. She campaigned with others for upgrades to Dunedin Hospital. She clashed with other councillors, particularly Lee Vandervis over mana whenua representation on local government level and accusations of racism were exchanged and code of conduct violations were alleged.

In July 2024, Laufiso, in a collective action with fellow Pasifika members of the Green Party Alofa Aiono and Vasemaca Tavola, resigned from the party over the ousting of Darleen Tana from parliament. The collective said the party co-leaders had "inflamed and weaponised media narratives, intentionally smearing Darleen’s character, integrity, and mana."

== Independent councillor, 2024–present ==
Soon after Laufiso became an independent politician on the city council in mid-August 2024Vandervis apologised for his comments after Laufiso's code of conduct action was upheld. Laufiso spoke against a "wokeism" label used to oppose a projected rainbow crossing in the city.

On 26 August 2025, Laufiso voted against a DCC motion to scrap the contentious Albany Street cycleway project, which passed by a vote of 8 to 7 votes. The Albany Street cycleway project would have involved removing 48 carparks near the University of Otago. Local business owners had criticised the DCC for not consulting them about the proposed project. Mayor Jules Radich has used his casting vote to pass the motion after Cr Jim O'Malley recused himself from the proceedings. That same day, Laufiso voted against a motion to scrap free Sunday parking in the Dunedin city centre, which passed by a vote of 11 to 4. On 23 September 2025, Laufiso supported Cr Christine Garey's motion to revoke the Council's decision to cancel the Albany Street connection, which passed by a margin of eight to seven votes.

In August 2025, Laufiso announced her candidacy in the 2025 Dunedin City Council election for both Mayor of Dunedin and city councillor under the ticket of Building Kotahitaka. In mid October 2025, she came fifth place in the mayoral race but was re-elected to the City Council.

On 12 November 2025, Laufiso supported a successful council motion to accept a budget overspend on the contentious Albany Street Connection Project, which passed by a margin of 8 to 7 votes.

== Political views ==
On The Spinoff's policy.nz website in 2022, Laufiso described her aims for a third term as participating in the council's "seven generations" vision, speaking on Te Tiriti o Waitangi-based community development, prioritising "every child and young person" and ensuring "ethnically-diverse communities have greater involvement in council's work."
