= Mandy Mayhem =

Politician and performer from New Zealand

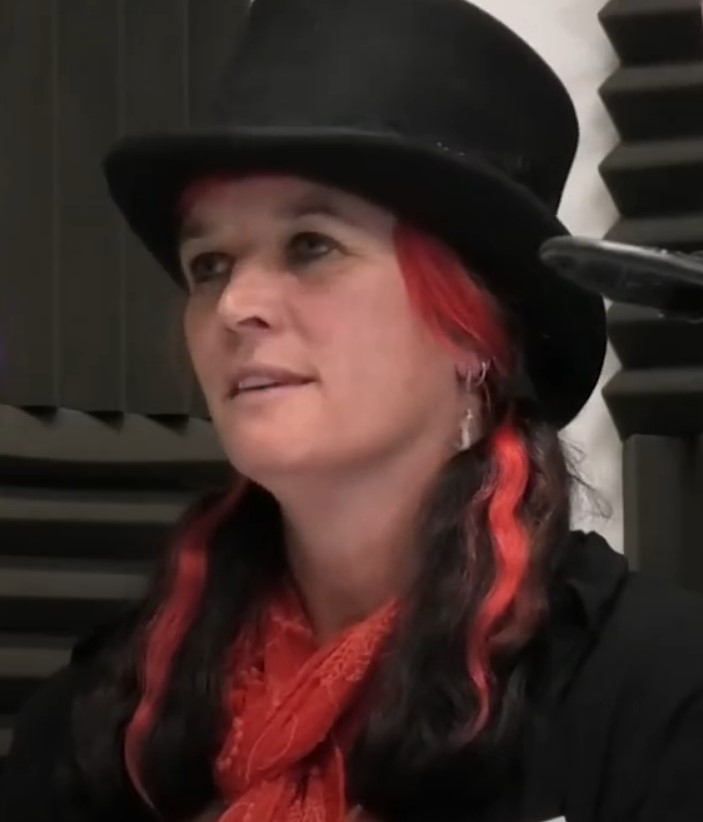
- Mayhem in 2019
- Born: Amanda Morrison; November 1972 (age 53); Dunedin, New Zealand
- Occupations: Local politician; Performer; Circus ringmaster; Artist
- Spouse: Lee Bullock (m. 2016)
- Children: Rose; Max; Vita

Amanda Morrison (born November 1972) better known as Mandy Mayhem and at times Mandy Mayhem-Bullock, (Note: Mayhem announced in 2022 that she was "dropping the Bullock.") is a local politician, celebrant, performer, circus ringmaster, newspaper deliverer, and artist based in Waitati and Dunedin, in New Zealand.

== Early life and family ==
Mayhem was born in November 1972 and raised in Dunedin. Mayhem was 5 years old when her mother moved her family to a 10-hectare property on a hill above a small township. By that time, the cluster of holiday homes had become affordable. She was a participant in the Dunedin Multidisciplinary Health and Development Study, its only subject to become a ringmaster.

=== School ===
Mayhem was educated at Waitati School and Otago Girls' High School. She unofficially went to Logan Park High School, by pretending to be a foreign exchange student at the school.

Mayhem moved to Wellington to complete a degree in women's studies at Victoria University of Wellington, while working as "Slaphappy the clown".

=== Family ===
Mandy married Lee Bullock in 2016, and has three children, Rose, Max, and Vita. Mayhem earlier donated egg cells, contributing to a friend's births of two other children.

The Mayhem-Bullock family lost a pet horse following a violent criminal attack on the animal in 2019.

== Community involvement ==
Mayhem runs a monthly community market in Waitati. She is the commander of the pacifist combat arm of the Waitati militia, a satirical "pacifist warfare" group formed over 50 years ago in protest against the Vietnam war. Mayhem is involved with the Coastal Communities Cycleway Connection, is chair of Keep Dunedin Beautiful and a local emergency response co-ordinator.

== Performance career ==
Mayhem worked in Wellington as a clown, then worked for five years with Ridgway Circus, where "Mayhem" was her stage name. She has a third-dan black belt in taekwondo, and considered representing New Zealand in what was then a demonstration sport at the 1992 Barcelona Olympics.

More recently, Mayhem wrote, directed and performed in a circus rock opera, The Carnival Ain't Over, for the 2021 Dunedin Fringe Festival, and has been organising the annual Wuthering Heights dance-along in the Octagon since 2019.

== Political career ==
Mayhem spent six years as a member of the Dunedin City Council's Waikouaiti-Coast Community Board and was elected to the council in October 2022. As of 2025 she is deputy chair of the city council's community services committee.

She is the unofficial mayor of Waitati, a small coastal settlement within Dunedin city.

Mayhem announced in May 2025 that she would stand as a candidate for Mayor of Dunedin and for city councillor in the 2025 Dunedin City Council election.

On 26 August 2025, Cr Mayhem voted against a DCC motion to scrap the contentious Albany Street cycleway project, which passed by a vote of 8 to 7 votes. The Albany Street cycleway project would have involved removing 48 carparks near the University of Otago. Local business owners had criticised the DCC for not consulting them about the proposed project. Mayor Jules Radich has used his casting vote to pass the motion after Cr Jim O'Malley recused himself from the proceedings. That same day, Mayhem voted in favour of a motion to scrap free Sunday parking in the Dunedin city centre, which passed by a vote of 11 to 4. On 23 September, Mayhem supported a revocation motion filed by Cr Christine Garey to revoke the council's decision to cancel the Albany Street connection, which passed by a margin of 8 to 7 votes.

During the New Zealand local elections which concluded on 11 October 2025, Mayhem came seventh place in the mayoral race but was re-elected to the City Council.

On 12 November 2025, Mayhem supported a successful council motion to accept a budget overspend on the contentious Albany Street Connection Project, which passed by a margin of 8 to 7 votes.

== Political views ==
Mayhem's 2022 election campaign cited accessibility, sustainability and wellbeing as political priorities.

In a 2023 interview, Mayhem said “I know what it is to be a solo mother. I know what it is to be forced to take budgeting advice at the foodbank," claiming that "older, white men – business people" on the council lack the same lived experience as her.

== See also ==
- Politics of New Zealand
- Mayor of Dunedin
