= 3 Guys =

Supermarket chain

3 Guys / Gubays
- Type: Supermarket chain
- Industry: Groceries
- Founded: 1973; 53 years ago in Auckland, New Zealand
- Founder: Albert Gubay
- Defunct: 2003
- Fate: Remaining stores rebranded as Price Chopper
- Successor: Price Chopper, Countdown, SuperValue
- Headquarters: Auckland, New Zealand
- Area served: Upper North Island, parts of Ireland and United States
- Owner: Albert Gubay (1973–1984)
- Parent: Progressive Enterprises (1985–2003)

3 Guys (also operating as Gubays) was a New Zealand, Irish and US supermarket chain that operated between 1973 and 2003.

== History ==
=== Albert Gubay era ===
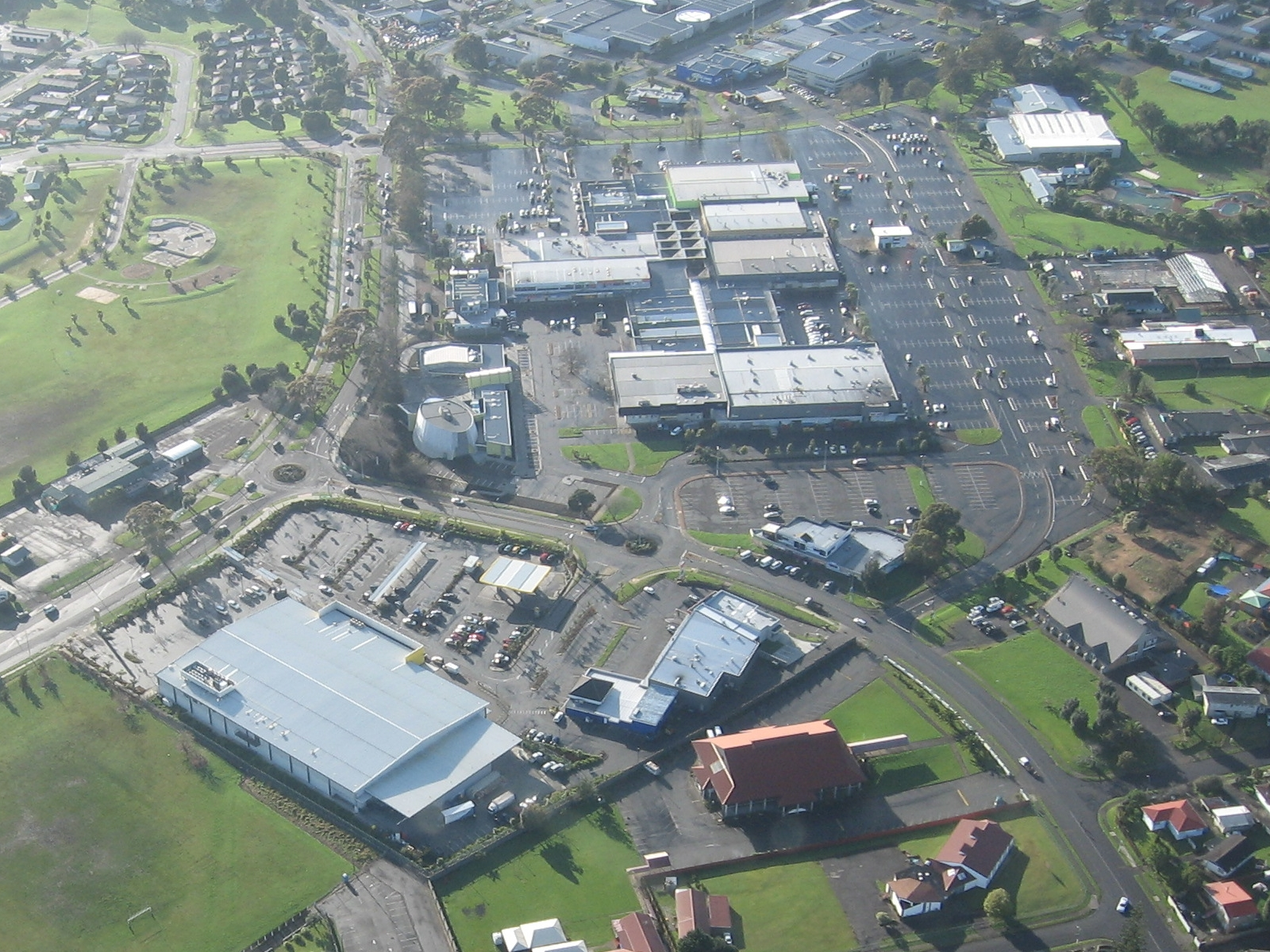
Māngere Town Centre, the location of the first 3 Guys supermarket.

Albert Gubay established the supermarket chain while living in New Zealand from January 1973 to April 1974. Shares in rival supermarket chain Foodtown fell dramatically when his move to New Zealand was confirmed.

Gubay asked the Minister of Trade and Industry Joe Walding to force Unilever and other suppliers to do business with him. However, an investigation found the suppliers were not breaking the law, and Unilever publicly offered to supply Gubay on similar terms to other buyers.

The first store was opened in Māngere in January 1973. Further stores were added in Papatoetoe, Mount Eden, and Northcote later that year.

Construction on a store in Glen Eden had begun by July 1973.

Plans for a store in Green Bay were scrapped due to local opposition. Gubay instead opted to build a store in Avondale, which opened in September 1975.

=== International expansion ===
Gubay also established 3 Guys supermarkets in Ireland in the 1970s. He sold these stores to the H Williams supermarket chain in 1986, which subsequently collapsed in the same year. Tesco purchased many of the former 3 Guys stores, branded as either Crazy Prices or 3 Guys, to create Tesco Ireland.

3 Guys stores were also opened in the United States from 1980, but the chain went bankrupt in 1985. The stores were sold to other chains like Food Lion.

=== Post-Gubay era ===
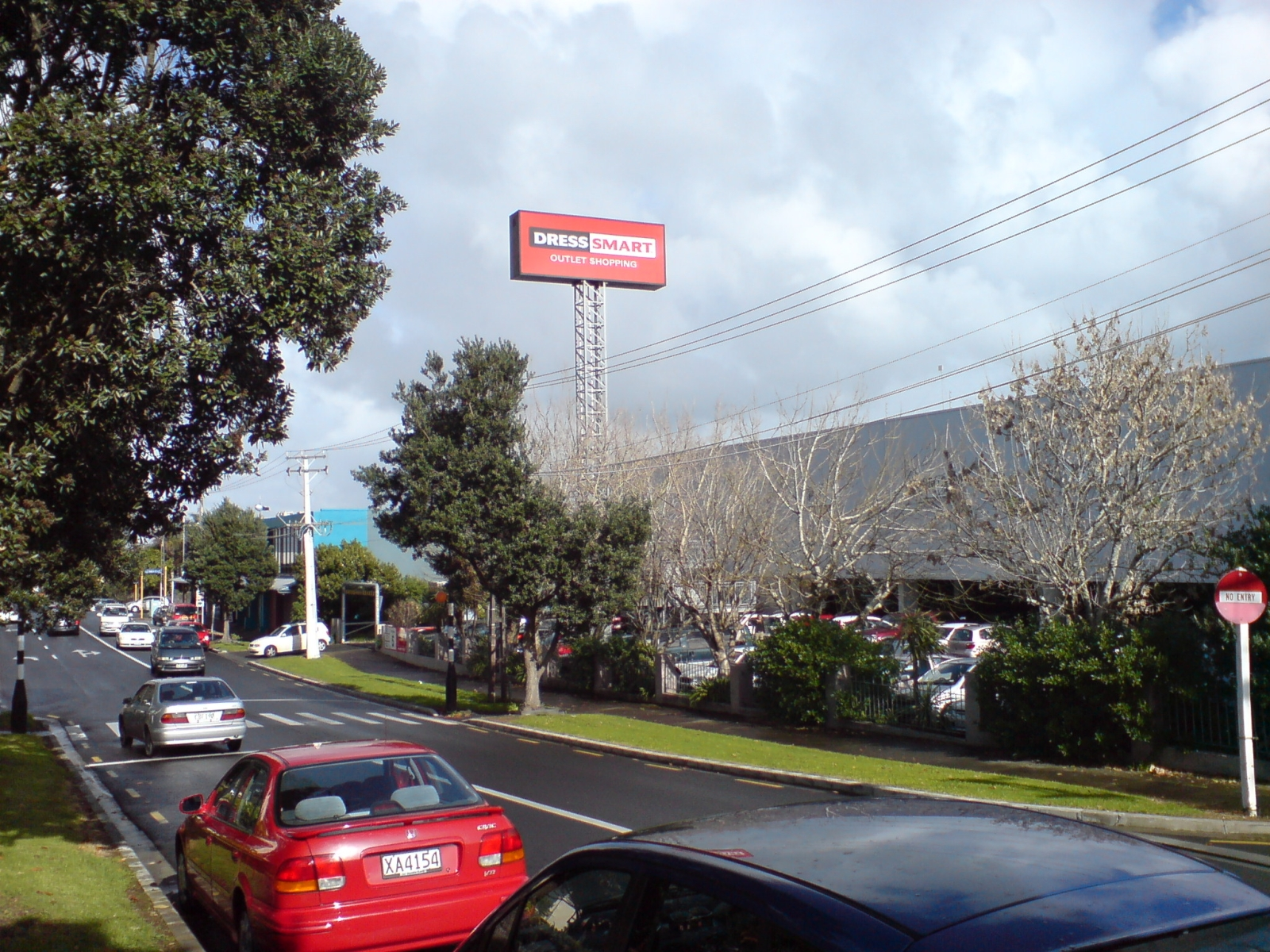
3 Guys Onehunga, redeveloped as Dress Smart.

Gubay put the New Zealand arm of 3 Guys up for sale in 1984. Progressive Enterprises bought the company in 1985.

Fourteen houses were demolished to build a New Plymouth store in 1992.

The Onehunga store, which included a New Zealand Post shop, was redeveloped into Dress Smart in 1995.

In early 1997, 3 Guys and Foodtown ran a campaign for the right to sell liquor at their Grey Lynn stores.

3 Guys and Progressive Enterprises merged into a single company in 1997.

The Avondale supermarket closed in June 1997, and its building was demolished. Auckland City Council took ownership of the site, selling part of it for private development in 2001.

In 2000, the Glen Eden supermarket was closed to make way for a new Housing New Zealand development. According to the Glen Eden Community Protection Society, it was established to protest the development and persuaded the developer to down-scale its plan. The supermarket carpark and part of the building was then sold to new owners in February 2001.

=== Closure and legacy ===
The chain had six stores at the start of 2003: its original Māngere store, three other Auckland stores in Orewa, Point Chevalier, Flat Bush, and stores in Huntly and Te Awamutu.

In response to Progressive Enterprise's 2002 purchase of Woolworths and the resulting increase in market share, the Commerce Commission required the company to sell 3 Guys Te Awamutu in January 2003. The remaining stores were rebranded as Price Chopper.

The Pukekohe supermarket site was redeveloped into a strip mall, which was sold as a single lot in 2007.

The site of the former Avondale supermarket remained vacant in 2019. It became popular for street art in 2017, and a structure was built to host street art in 2021. A similarly named "Free Guys Supermarket" opened in Avondale during the COVID-19 pandemic to provide free groceries to low-income households.
