= No Frills (brand) =

Supermarket own brand

- Product type: Food
- Country: Australia, Hong Kong, New Zealand
- Introduced: 1978; 48 years ago
- Discontinued: 2011; 15 years ago
- Markets: Franklins, Price Chopper, Big Fresh and Wellcome

No Frills was a supermarket own brand. It was started in 1978 by the Australian supermarket Franklins, and expanded into New Zealand supermarkets Price Chopper and Big Fresh as well as Hong Kong retailer Wellcome in the 1980s. In Australia, No Frills was discontinued in the early 2010s when Pick 'n Pay sold the Franklins brand to Metcash.

== History ==
No Frills was established in 1978 by the Australian supermarket Franklins. It was the first generic brand in Australia. Originally the No Frills brand was only used on peanut butter, honey and chips. Coverage was later expanded to over 800 different products. No Frills came to New Zealand in the 1980s, to Price Chopper and Big Fresh supermarkets, meaning that the brand was operated under Woolworths New Zealand. The brand came to an end in the early 2000s after Price Chopper and Big Fresh went out of business. After Progressive Enterprises bought the New Zealand branch of Woolworths, it dropped No Frills and First Choice to focus on the Signature and Basics brands. After Woolworths (Australia) bought 67 Franklins stores, Woolworths was required to stop selling the No Frills and First Choice brands within three months. This was because they were only allowed to use the Franklins and No Frills brand and trade names for a transitional period.

In 1998 it was estimated that in the South Island of New Zealand, No Frills had a market share of 2.8% for milk sold in supermarkets.

Fellow Dairy Farm International subsidiary Wellcome in Hong Kong introduced No Frills (Chinese: 特惠牌; Jyutping: dak6 wai6 paai4) as its house brand in 1980. It initially adopted the same logo and similar packaging styling to the one used in Australia, before Henry Steiner revamped the brand's visual identity to better communicate the affordable prices to customers. The brand was phased out in 2021 in favour of the new Meadows Essential line.

== See also ==
- Pams
