= Albert Gubay =

Welsh businessman and philanthropist (1928-2016)

Albert Gubay KC*SG
- Born: 9 April 1928; Rhyl, Denbighshire, Wales
- Died: 5 January 2016 (aged 87); Wilmslow, Cheshire, England
- Occupation: Businessman
- Years active: 1959–2016
- Spouse(s): Unknown (divorced) Carmel (m. 1971)
- Children: 2
- Website: Official

Albert Gubay KC*SG (9 April 1928 – 5 January 2016) was a Welsh businessman and philanthropist, who made his fortune with the Kwik Save retail chain, building it further on investments, mainly in property development. According to Forbes, in 2006 Gubay had an estimated fortune of approximately £500 million ($1.1 billion), making him the 698th richest person in the world.

== Early life ==
Gubay was born on 9 April 1928 in Rhyl, to an Iraqi Jewish father, and an Irish Catholic mother, Mary Clarke. Gubay began his business career in North Wales selling non-sugar sweets during post-World War II confectionery rationing. When rationing came to an end in the mid-1950s, the confectionery business ran into difficulties and Gubay moved into retailing via market stalls.

== Career ==
=== Kwik Save ===
Gubay founded Value Foods on 11 May 1959 in Prestatyn, and rented its first retail shop in Rhyl in July 1959. His aggressive price cutting resulted in some manufacturers refusing to supply him.

In 1964 Gubay visited the United States with fellow director Ken Nicholson, and learnt about the "baby shark" method of retailing. Combined with ideas gained from West German retailer Aldi, the business model was based on buying goods on favourable (net 60 or 90) payment terms, distributing and selling them at or below cost before the payment fell due, and using the interest on the resulting cash flow to fund the business. The first Kwik Save Discount branded store opened in Prestatyn in 1965, and produced more sales than the existing Value Foods supermarkets. The second opened in Colwyn Bay, and by 1970 Kwik Save Discount had 24 stores.

Just before it was floated on to the London Stock Exchange in November 1970, the company changed its name formally to Kwik Save Discount Group Ltd. In 1973, Gubay sold Kwik Save for £14M/$28 million.

=== 3 Guys ===
After selling Kwik Save, Gubay repeated the low-price retail model in New Zealand, Ireland and the United States:

Gubay established the 3 Guys chain in Auckland, New Zealand, while he was living there between January 1973 and April 1974. He expanded the chain to at least six stores, which he sold in 1984. Shares in rival supermarket chain Foodtown fell dramatically when his visit was confirmed. Gubay publicly asked the New Zealand Minister of Trade and Industry Joe Walding to force Unilever and other suppliers to do business with him, but an investigation found the suppliers were not breaking the law. Unilever publicly offered to supply Gubay on similar terms to other buyers.

Further 3 Guys stores were opened in Ireland in the 1970s. These stores were sold to the H Williams supermarket chain in 1986, which subsequently collapsed the same year. Tesco purchased many of the former 3 Guys stores, branded as either Crazy Prices or 3 Guys, to create Tesco Ireland.

3 Guys stores were also opened in the United States from 1980, but the chain went bankrupt in 1985. The stores were sold to other chains like Food Lion.

=== Total Fitness ===
While recovering from a back injury, Gubay founded fitness chain Total Fitness. In July 2007, Gubay sold the chain, based mainly in North West England and Ireland, with 21 locations and 150,000 members, to the private equity arm of Legal & General, for £70 million.

=== Portville ===
Gubay later moved his focus to property development, via Portville. He had mass investments, mainly in the United Kingdom and Ireland. He was named the top property developer in Wales in 2005.

== Church giving and charity ==
In the 1980s, Gubay paid for a replacement Roman Catholic church at the site of St Anthony's in Onchan, Isle of Man. The church was designed by Clayton/Massey, with local architect John Cryer responsible for the interior, and Gubay's suggestion of a window illustrating Christ walking on Douglas Bay by Chris Spittall as a focal point. In 1990, Gubay paid for an extension to Our Lady of the Nativity church in Leixlip, County Kildare, in memory of his mother, Mary Clarke, a native of the area.

Gubay funded an Isle of Man Government bursary programme, which means that students from the Isle of Man can enter any of the world's top ten universities.

=== "Pact with God" ===
In summer 1997, Gubay told an RTÉ television documentary that he had made a "50–50" deal with God, promising when he was younger and penniless to give half his estate to the Roman Catholic Church, if he succeeded in becoming a millionaire.

In March 2010, at the age of 82, Gubay announced that he was to transfer £470 million of his £480 million personal fortune to a charitable trust, the Albert Gubay Charitable Foundation. The Foundation makes grants from three funds, The British Church Fund, The General Fund and The Irish Church Fund, with grants funding projects run by registered charities in England, Wales, Isle of Man and Republic of Ireland.

== Personal life ==
Gubay divorced his first wife.

From 1971 Gubay and his second wife, Carmel Gubay, lived in Santon, Isle of Man. He had two children by his first wife, and was petitioned to stay on the island by locals after threatening to leave for Switzerland as a result of a dispute over taxes.

== Honours and awards ==
On 23 February 2011, Gubay was invested as Knight Commander with Star of the Order of St. Gregory the Great (KC*SG) by the Archbishop of Westminster, Vincent Nichols. Gubay was honoured with this Papal knighthood for his conspicuous service to the Church and society.

In 2025 Bangor University officially renamed its business school to the Albert Gubay Business School following a £10.5 million donation from the Albert Gubay Charitable Foundation. The school is moving to a new, state-of-the-art facility on Ffriddoedd Road, and is set for completion around 2027.

== Death ==
Gubay died aged 87, following a short illness, at his home in Wilmslow, Cheshire, on 5 January 2016. His funeral was held in the Roman Catholic Church in Onchan, a church which was redeveloped thanks to Gubay's donation in the 1980s.
