= Order of St. Gregory the Great =

Papal Order of Knighthood of the Holy See

Pontifical Equestrian Order of St. Gregory the Great: Ordo Sancti Gregorii Magni (Latin); Ordine di San Gregorio Magno (Italian)
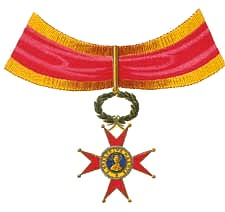
- Knight Commander's cross of the Order of St. Gregory the Great

Awarded by the Holy See
- Type: Papal order of knighthood
- Established: 1 September 1831; 195 years ago
- Religious affiliation: Catholic
- Motto: Pro Deo et Principe (Latin); For God and Ruler (English)
- Status: Currently constituted
- First head: Pope Gregory XVI
- Sovereign: Pope Leo XIV
- Classes: Knight/Dame Grand Cross (GCSG); Knight/Dame Commander with Star (KC*SG/DC*SG); Knight/Dame Commander (KCSG/DCSG); Knight/Dame (KSG/DSG)
- Former grades: Knight/Dame Grand Cross of the Second Class

Precedence
- Next (higher): Order of Pope Pius IX
- Next (lower): Order of St. Sylvester
- Ribbon bar of the order

The Pontifical Equestrian Order of St. Gregory the Great (Latin: Ordo Sancti Gregorii Magni; Italian: Ordine di San Gregorio Magno) was established on 1 September 1831, by Pope Gregory XVI, seven months after his election as Pope.

The order is one of the five orders of knighthood of the Holy See. The honor is bestowed upon Catholic men and women (and certain notable non-Catholics) in recognition of their personal service to the Holy See and to the Catholic Church, through their unusual labors, their support of the Holy See, and the examples they set in their communities and their countries.

The Order of Saint Gregory the Great is the most recognizable of the papal awards and the most frequently granted to lay persons based on their merits.

Based on the Acta Apostolica Sedis, 4177 persons have received (globally) a pontifical knighthood between 2000 and 2020 (the UK had 181 recipients and France 170). From the awardees of papal knighthood, the recipients of the Order of Saint Gregory are the most numerous.

== History and appointment ==
The criteria for the conferment of the Order of Saint Gregory

The constitutional pontifical norms of the Order of Saint Gregory are the following : Quod summis quibusque (1 September 1831), Cum amplissima honorum (20 March 1834), and Multum ad excitandos (7 February 1905).

The inaugural brief states, in part, that "gentlemen of proven loyalty to the Holy See who, by reason of their nobility of birth and the renown of their deeds or the degree of their munificence, are deemed worthy to be honored by a public expression of esteem on the part of the Holy See". The end of the brief states that they must progressively maintain, by continued meritorious deed, the reputation and trust they had already inspired, and prove themselves worthy of the honor that had been conferred on them, by unswerving fidelity to God and to the sovereign Pontiff.

The instruction on the conferral of Papal Honours issued by the Secretariat of State of the Holy See, provides a description of the general principles common to all the papal orders:

- they are only addressed to lay people, including men and women, Catholic or not, and excluding the Clergy (they have their own honours’ system).

- The awards are provided as a “mark of appreciation and recognition of services given” by the recipients to the Church.

- They are granted on an “incremental basis” with defined requirements on the age of the candidates.

- The application needs to be duly documented to establish the merits of the candidate.

- Finally, the number of awardees are limited per diocese on a yearly basis.

The instruction provides detailed information on the minimum age to received such an award (40 years old for a knight, 45 years old for a commander, ...). The instruction also provide details on specific categories of persons belonging to the laity: police, military (the order being granted as from the rank of Lieutenant Colonel), diplomats accredited to the Holy See (as from the rank of Attaché or secretary), and staff working with the Roman curia (as from the rank of Addetti di Segreteria).

The awarding of the Order of St. Gregory the Great presents no particular obligations on the recipients toward the Catholic Church – except for the general ones stated above.

How to receive a pontifical award

Admission is never achieved through personal application. The conferral can be made directly by the Pope, at his own initiative and following his own choice. This would be the exception. In principle, the granting of an order is always the result of a “presentation”. Indeed, the candidate is presented or sponsored by a responsible authority.

The presentation will be made by the bishop in whose diocese the candidate is resident. The instruction indicates that it can also be the Vicar General who can make a proposal provided he has an authorisation from his bishop to do so.

In several dioceses, specific committees have been created to provide advice to the Bishop on any awards. This would be the case in Australian dioceses with the “Parramatta Diocesan Honours Committee” or the “Archdiocesan Ecclesiastical and Civic Honours Committee of the Archdiocese of Sydney”.

In relation to any application, the instruction state that the Bishop will need to provide the curriculum vitæ of the candidate including factual information (age, profession, family and social condition) and description of the candidate’s “worthiness in the eyes of the Church”. Once completed and approved by the bishop, the application file is sent to the competent Nuncio who will issue his Nihil Obstat and will in turn send the whole file to the Secretariat.

It is the Cardinal Secretary of State who is responsible of accepting or not the application. In this respect, the Cardinal Secretary of State has the right to make the appointments and will sign the papal brief non mandato.

The new Apostolic Constitution Praedicate evangelium states that it is the Section for General Affairs (first section) of the Secretariat of State which is in charge “to prepare documentation for the granting of papal honours”.

Evidence

Contrary to any other decoration awarded by a country to a foreign subject, the Pope does not obtain prior permission of the foreign office of the country of the recipient upon whom he wishes to confer such an honour.

There is no permanent list of persons who have received papal honours. A former spokesman of the Holy See stated that “the names of people who receive the knighthood don't appear in the Holy See's yearbook and that the honour dies with the individual”. The only evidence of a conferral is the insertion of the name of the recipient in the Acta Apostolicae Sedis (AAS). The bestowal of a papal knighthood will take effect once it has been gazetted in the AAS.

Legal aspects

Pontifical orders are not conferred by the Holy See in which sovereignty rests under international law, nor by the Vatican City State which is the geographical location where the Holy See resides. Pontifical orders are personal and absolute gifts of the Pope. They are awarded as an order of merit in accordance with the status of the relevant order. It is understood that the Pope is the source of honour (fons honorum) which means that he is the ultimate authority from which all papal honours come.

The Pope can do whatever he wants as the sovereign of all pontifical orders, awards and honours. A pope can abolish any or all of the orders of knighthood if he wishes. He is not bound by tradition nor precedent. In practice, this means that the reigning Pope can change a tradition which is not incorporated in the existing statues of the order. This is however only possible if the Popes makes appropriate changes to the statutes of the relevant orders.

No new orders have been created since 1905. Popes reformed the current orders during the twentieth century notably by removing the nobility clause from the Order of Pius IX, added new ranks in the three orders, and including women as recipients of all the Pontifical orders. On this last point, it was proposed to create, at the time of the Vatican II Council, an order of merit for women. The idea was not discussed further and the access to the three orders of pontifical knighthood was progressively implemented under the pontificate of John-Paul II.

Duties

It is understood that when a person is awarded a pontifical knighthood, this creates a special bound between the recipient and the Holy See.

For a practicing Catholic, the granting of such an honour creates a reinforced call to serve the Church. Cardinal Jacques Martin recalls that “A Papal Knighthood is not viewed solely as an honour, as a reward: it also incorporates a duty and a mission, that of serving and protecting the person of the Vicar of Christ. […] It is not the honour that matters, but one’s obligations and service”.

For a non-Catholic recipient, it is assumed that he would act prudently and will not make hostile statement on the Pope or the Church.

For honours granted on a “pro-forma” basis, notably in the context of official visits by heads of state or government at the Vatican, it is understood that the recipients would act respectfully towards the Holy See.

Finally, in very few cases, it emerges that a recipient has had an immoral conduct prior, during, of after having received a papal honour. Lord Acton on the one hand stated that “Papal knighthood are not awarded as a sign of holiness or a reward for sanctity – but a recognition of active generosity to the Church and her works”. On the other hand, a Catholic journalist stated that such papal knighthoods “should be reserved for those who’ve worked hard in the cause of the Church”. A member of the UK Parliament (dealing with the relations with the Holy See) further stressed that “a knight is a tremendous privilege that should be reserved for the most deserving” and that “it should not be in the possession of those who fall short of the behaviour expected by the Church”.

Rights

While the honour is completely honorific, papal knights enjoy special rights in accordance with the constitutive documents of the orders of knighthood, relevant Church customs and ceremonial practice.

The first material sign is the reception by the papal knight of a pontifical brief appointing the recipient in a defined order at a specific rank. He will also receive a medal, its miniature and the rosetta (which is not provided by the Secretariat but by the Bishop or the applicant).

Wearing the medal would be limited to very specific occasion (Church ceremonies in specific countries). This would be also the case for the miniature (at official events). Wearing the rosetta on the lapel of a jacket is more common. A French recipient states in this respect that she wears the rosetta “in a spirit of recognition towards the Church” and to recall that “she is part of the Church and is willing to continue to serve”.

The traditional nineteenth century uniforms still exist with specific designs for each orders. They are worn in some countries (such as the UK, Ireland, Nigeria) but not in other countries (notably France and Germany).

A papal knight or dame is not necessarily allowed to wear any specific title in front of his or her name. This would depend on the customs of the country of the recipient; Nigeria would allow it, while the UK would not. A Scottish recipient states in this respect: “you are not allowed to call yourself sir […] which would feel a bit ridiculous. However, they are letter added to the end of your name”. Indeed, in the Anglo-Saxon tradition, the recipients would be entitled to add the letters of the decoration at the end of his or her name: for instance, a knight of the Order of Saint Gregory the Great would add KSG (and DSG for a dame).

According to the Roman Catholic tradition, recipients of a papal order would be asked to attend the major events of their diocese. Recipients will be saluted by the Swiss guards any time they visit the Vatican (they would then need to wear their medal). Papal knights would even be allowed to enter any churches on horseback (or even Saint Peter's Basilica).

== Insignia ==
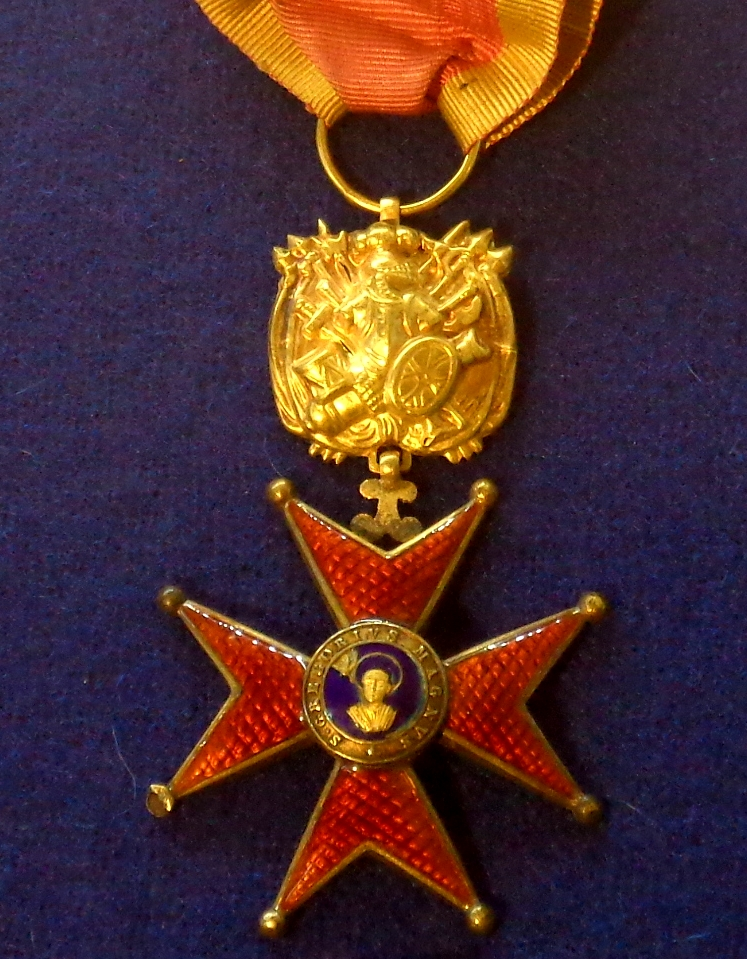
Knight's badge in the military division

An eight-pointed cross, the insignia of the order, bears a representation of St. Gregory on the obverse and on the reverse the motto Pro Deo et Principe ("For God and Ruler"). The cross is suspended from a red and gold ribbon. In ecclesiastical heraldry, laymen awarded the high rank of Grand Cross can display a red and gold ribbon surrounding the shield in their personal coats of arms, but the recipients of the lower ranks place an appropriate ribbon below the shield. The difference between the civilian and military insignia is that the former group wears the cross hanging from a green crown of laurel, whereas the latter group wears the cross hanging from a trophy of arms.

== Vestments and accoutrements ==
The Order comprises four classes:

- Knight/Dame Grand Cross (GCSG)
- Knight/Dame Commander with Star (KC*SG/DC*SG)
- Knight/Dame Commander (KCSG/DCSG)
- Knight/Dame (KSG/DSG)

A green uniform was later prescribed by Pope Pius IX. The uniform contains a black beaver-felt hat decorated with black silk ribbons, silver metallic twisted rope, buttons and black ostrich feathers. The jacket, made of green wool, is trimmed with silver metallic thread, and has a tail, nine yellow metal buttons in the front and three buttons on the cuffs and is lined with black satin. Finally, the costume contains suspenders, several yellow and red rosettes, white leather gloves, and a short sword with a handle made of mother of pearl with a medallion of the order at the end.

Knights Grand Cross wear a sash and a badge or star on the left side of the breast; Commanders wear a cross around the neck; and Knights wear a smaller cross on the left breast of the uniform:

Knight	Knight Commander	Knight Commander with Star	Knight Grand Cross

== Notable members ==
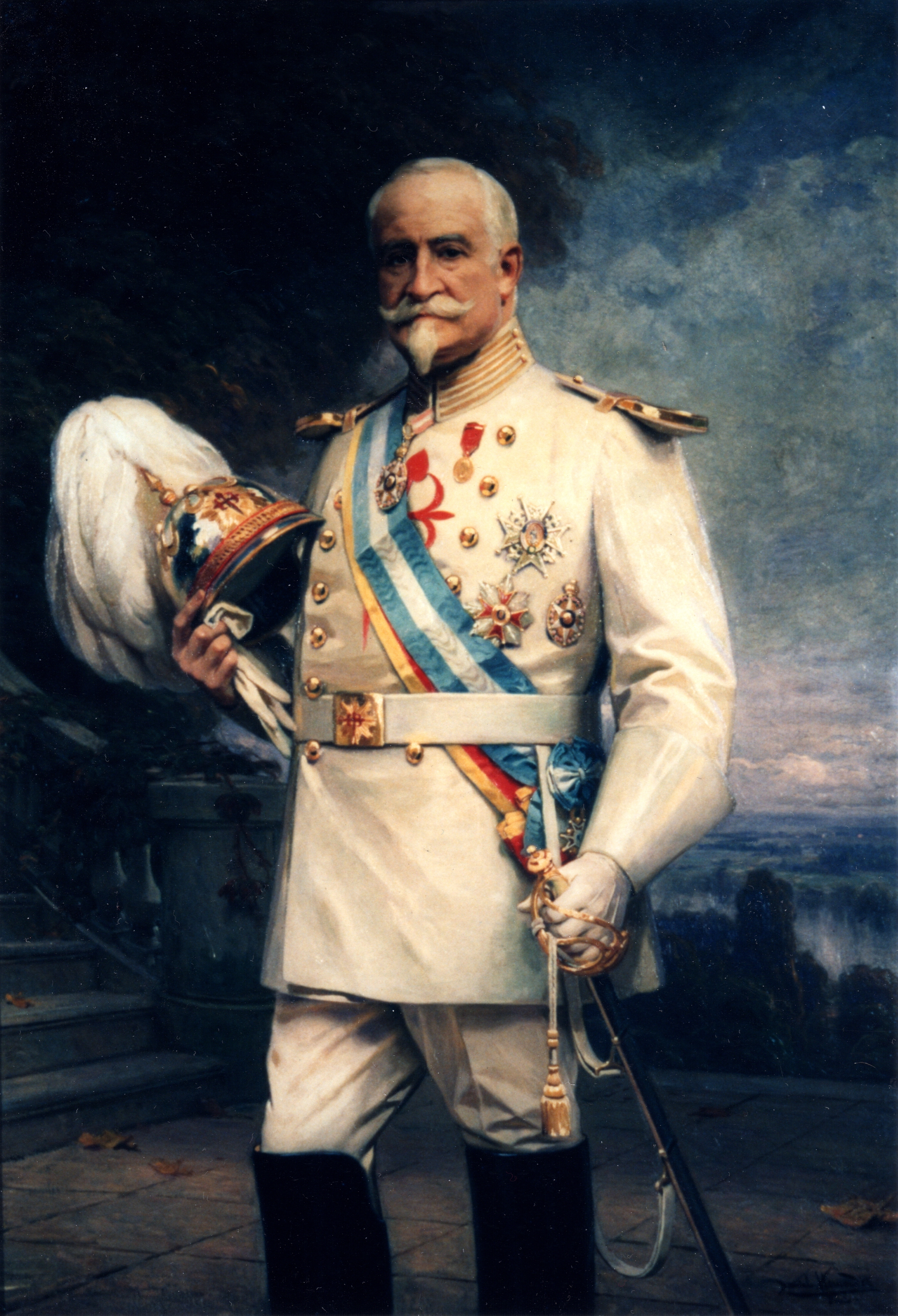
Juan Mariano de Goyeneche y Gamio, 3rd Count of Guaqui and Grandee of Spain, wearing the Grand Cross and sash of the Order of St. Gregory the Great.

=== Knight/Dame Grand Cross ===
- Frederick Blakeney, 1964, Australian diplomat, Knight Grand Cross
- Dominique, Prince de La Rochefoucauld-Montbel, 2023, Knight Grand Cross
- Sir George Bowyer, 6th Baronet, Knight Grand Cross
- General Sir Peter Cosgrove, 2013, Knight Grand Cross, Governor-General of Australia
- João Carlos Saldanha de Oliveira Daun, 1st Duke of Saldanha, Knight Grand Cross of the First Class
- Rodrigo Augusto da Silva, Knight Grand Cross of the First Class
- Baron Henry Delvaux de Fenffe, 1921, Governor of Liège
- Duke Carl Ludvig Fouché d'Otrante (1930)
- George Forbes, 7th Earl of Granard, Knight Grand Cross
- Édouard de Castelnau, French general
- Frank Hanna III, American entrepreneur and philanthropist, Knight Grand Cross
- Alice von Hildebrand, 2013, Dame Grand Cross
- Charles von Hügel, 1852, Knight Grand Cross
- Johno Johnson, 2015, Australian politician
- Dina Kawar, previous ambassador of Jordan to France
- Gilbert Levine, 2016, American conductor, Knight Grand Cross
- Riccardo Muti, 2012, Italian conductor, Knight Grand Cross
- James Joseph Norris, 1947, American Catholic humanitarian
- Juan Domingo Perón, Caballero de la Gran Cruz (28 de Junio de 1947)
- Count Christopher de Paus (1930)
- Count Hippolyte d'Ursel
- Count Léo d'Ursel, ambassador
- Count Charles Woeste
- Chev Jose Rivera GCSG (2005)

=== Knight/Dame Commander with Star ===
- G. K. Chesterton, 1934, English writer, philosopher, lay theologian, and literary and art critic (convert to Catholicism)
- Sir William Deane Governor-General of Australia
- Gloria, Princess of Thurn and Taxis, 2008, Dame Commander with Star
- Albert Gubay, 2011, founder of Kwik Save supermarket chain and Total Fitness
- Bob Hope, 1998, American entertainer (convert to Catholicism)
- Francis Martin O'Donnell, 2007, Ambassador and Knight of Malta, previously in UN service for 32 years

=== Knight Commander and Dame Commander ===
- Roy E. Disney, 1998
- Sir Patrick Duffy, 2017, British politician
- Joseph Ghougassian, 1989, United States Ambassador to Qatar who persuaded the Qatari government to end its prohibition against public worship by Christians and other non-Islamic groups
- Charles Guthrie, Baron Guthrie of Craigiebank, 2008, Chief of the Defence Staff (United Kingdom)
- Hendrik Samuel Houthakker, 2003, Knight Commander with Silver Star, Member of Nixon's Council of Economic Advisers, husband of Anna-Teresa Tymieniecka.
- John Hume, 2012, Northern Irish politician and co-recipient of the 1998 Nobel Peace Prize
- Ignazio Jacometti, sculptor, appointed by Pope Pius IX.
- Saunders Lewis, 1975, Welsh nationalist politician, founder of Plaid Genedlaethol Cymru and prominent figure in Welsh-language literature (convert to Catholicism)
- John McLoughlin, 1847, Hudson's Bay Company Chief Factor of Fort Vancouver, 1st mayor of Oregon City.
- Kevin McNamara, British Politician
- Maurice Gerard Moynihan, 1959, Secretary of the Government of the Irish Free State and Governor of the Central Bank of Ireland
- Rupert Murdoch, 1998, Australian-American publisher and media entrepreneur
- Oscar Niemeyer, 1990, Brazilian modernist architect
- Nikkyō Niwano, 1992, Japanese Buddhist practitioner who founded the Buddhist organization Risshō Kōsei Kai.
- James Joseph Norris, September 13, 1955, American Catholic humanitarian, Lay Auditor at the Second Vatican Council, delivered major address at the Council on "World Poverty and the Christian Conscience". Charter member of the Pontifical Council for Justice and Peace and the Pontifical Council "Cor Unum". Represented the Holy See at the funeral of Dr. Martin Luther King Jr.
- Casto Méndez Núñez, 1849, Spanish Navy officer, future contralmirante (counter admiral)
- James O'Donnell, 1999, organist and Master of the Choristers, Westminster Abbey
- Lilianne Ploumen, 2017, Dutch politician
- Charles Poletti, 1945, Governor of New York, Army officer in charge of post World War II civil affairs in Italy
- John J. Raskob, American financial executive and businessman (DuPont, General Motors); financed the building of the Empire State Building
- Carlo Emanuele Ruspoli, 3rd Duke of Morignano, 2004
- Paul Salamunovich, 1969, American choral conductor and expert on Gregorian chant.
- Sir Jimmy Savile, 1990, English radio DJ and television presenter-broadcaster (In 2012, after Savile's death, an annulment of the honor was requested by the Archbishop of Westminster. This was declined on the basis that the life honor died with the individual.)
- Roger Wagner, by Pope Paul VI, American choral conductor
- Mordecai Waxman, 1998, Rabbi (Conservative Judaism)

=== Knight/Dame ===
- Walter Annenberg, who created TV Guide
- Mariano Armellini, Italian archaeologist
- Thomas Bodkin, lawyer, art historian, art collector and curator
- Joanna Bogle, 2013, British Roman Catholic writer and broadcaster
- Phyllis Bowman, 1996, British journalist and anti-abortion campaigner
- Esteban Campodónico, 1928, Italian-Peruvian medical doctor, university professor, and philanthropist
- James Carine, Royal Navy officer.
- Henry Cooper, 1978, champion heavyweight boxer (convert to Catholicism)
- John J. Coppinger, 1861, US Army major general
- John A. Creighton, 1898, businessman and philanthropist in Omaha
- John Crichton-Stuart, 3rd Marquess of Bute
- Ralph Downes, 1970, English organist, organist of the London Oratory, organ teacher and organ designer (including organ of the Royal Festival Hall London)
- Jude Patrick Dougherty, 1999, American philosopher, Dean Emeritus of the School of Philosophy at the Catholic University of America
- Eamon Duffy, 2017, Irish historian and emeritus Professor of the History of Christianity at the University of Cambridge
- Edward Leigh, 2026, British MP for Gainsborough and President of the Catholic Union of Great Britain 2014-2023
- Philip Duffy, 1982, Master of Music at the Liverpool Metropolitan Cathedral from 1966 to 1996
- Joseph Esposito, 2002, Chief of the New York City Police Department
- Brian Gill, Lord Gill, (2011) Lord President of Scotland 2012–2015
- Alfred Grünberger, 1924, Austrian Minister of Foreign Affairs.
- Emanuele Luigi Galizia, Maltese architect and civil engineer
- Joe Gladwin, British actor and comedian
- Sheilagh Kesting, 2016, former Moderator of the General Assembly of the Church of Scotland and former Ecumenical Officer of the Church of Scotland
- Ilyas Khan, British businessman and philanthropist, Chairman of Leonard Cheshire Disability
- Sebastian Kyalwazi, 1968, Ugandan surgeon, researcher and academic.
- Yuri Nikolayevich Maklakov, teacher of Russian language and literature
- George Malcolm, English choral conductor, harpsichordist and organist; former Master of the Music, Westminster Cathedral
- Colin Mawby, 2006, English choral conductor and composer former Master of the Music, Westminster Cathedral
- John A. McCone, 1955, US Industrialist, former Director of the Central Intelligence Agency, and former head of the Atomic Energy Commission
- George Menachery, 2008, Editor of the St Thomas Christian Encyclopaedia of India and Director of the SARAS, philanthropist
- Jean Migneault, former Deputy Supreme Knight of the Knights of Columbus
- Patrick Millen, 1991, New Zealand public servant
- Ricardo Montalbán, 1998, Mexican / American actor
- Paul Victor Obeng, 2009, Ghanaian mechanical engineer and statesman
- Isabel Piczek, 1998, artist
- George E. Prindible, 1929, industrialist and philanthropist
- Patrick Russill, 2024, English organist, director of music of the London Oratory, Emeritus Head of Choral Conducting at the Royal Academy of Music, Emeritus Professor (2024) of the University of London
- Joseph Ryelandt, Belgian composer
- Bhai Sahib Bhai Mohinder Singh Ahluwalia, chairman of the Guru Nanak Nishkam Sewak Jatha UK, and Sikh interfaith dialogue leader
- Bambang Soegeng, Chief of Staff of the Indonesian Army
- Jovan Sundečić, 1886, Serbian Orthodox priest and Montenegrin official
- J. L. P. Roche Victoria (Former State Minister from Tamil Nadu).
- Ann Widdecombe, 2013, British politician
- Michael Williams, 2001, English actor

== General and cited references ==
BOOKS

- Peter Bander van Buren, Orders of Knighthood and of Merit: The Pontifical, Religious and Secularised Catholic-Founded Orders and Their Relationship to the Apostolic See, Ed. Colin Smythe, 1995.
- Dominique Henneresse, Ordres et décorations du Saint-Siège, Ed. Libreria Editrice Vaticana (Vatican), 2019.
- James-Charles Noonan, Jr., The Church Visible, The ceremonial life and protocol of the Roman Catholic Church, Ed. Pinguin Group (New York), 1996.

ARTICLES

- Karaula, Željko (2009). "Pisma crnogorskog pjesnika, svećenika i diplomata Jovana Sunečića bosansko-đakovačkom i srijemskom biskupu Josipu Jurju Strossmayeru (1881–1887)". Diacovensia (in Croatian) (12). Đakovo: Katolički bogoslovni fakultet u Đakovu. ISSN 1849-014X.
- Miguel Delgado Galindo, “Ordini equestri e diritto canonico: annotazioni per un inquadramento giuridico”, Ius Ecclesiae, 33/1 (2021), pp. 307–331.
- Anthony Chiegboka & Elizabeth Ezenweke, “The Identity, Rights and Challenges of Catholic Knights in the Church”, Unizik Journal of Arts and Humanities (Nigeria), Vol. 11 No. 1 (2010), pp. 150–182.
