= No Frills (disambiguation) =

A no frills service or product is one for which the non-essential features have been removed to keep the price low.

No Frills may also refer to:

- No Frills (brand), a supermarket own brand, started by the Australian supermarket Franklins
- No Frills (grocery store), a Canadian supermarket
- No Frills (TV series), a British television sitcom
- No Frills (Bette Midler album) (1983), the sixth studio album by American singer Bette Midler
- No Frills (Nik Kershaw album) (2010), the eighth album by Nik Kershaw
- No Frills Supermarkets, a grocery chain in Nebraska and Iowa
- No Frills, a home brand of products sold at Franklins
- No Frills, a home brand of products formerly sold at Kwik Save
- No Frills, a home brand of products formerly sold at Pathmark
- No Frills, a home brand of products sold at Wellcome

== See also ==
- Frill (disambiguation)
