= Foodtown =

New Zealand supermarket chain

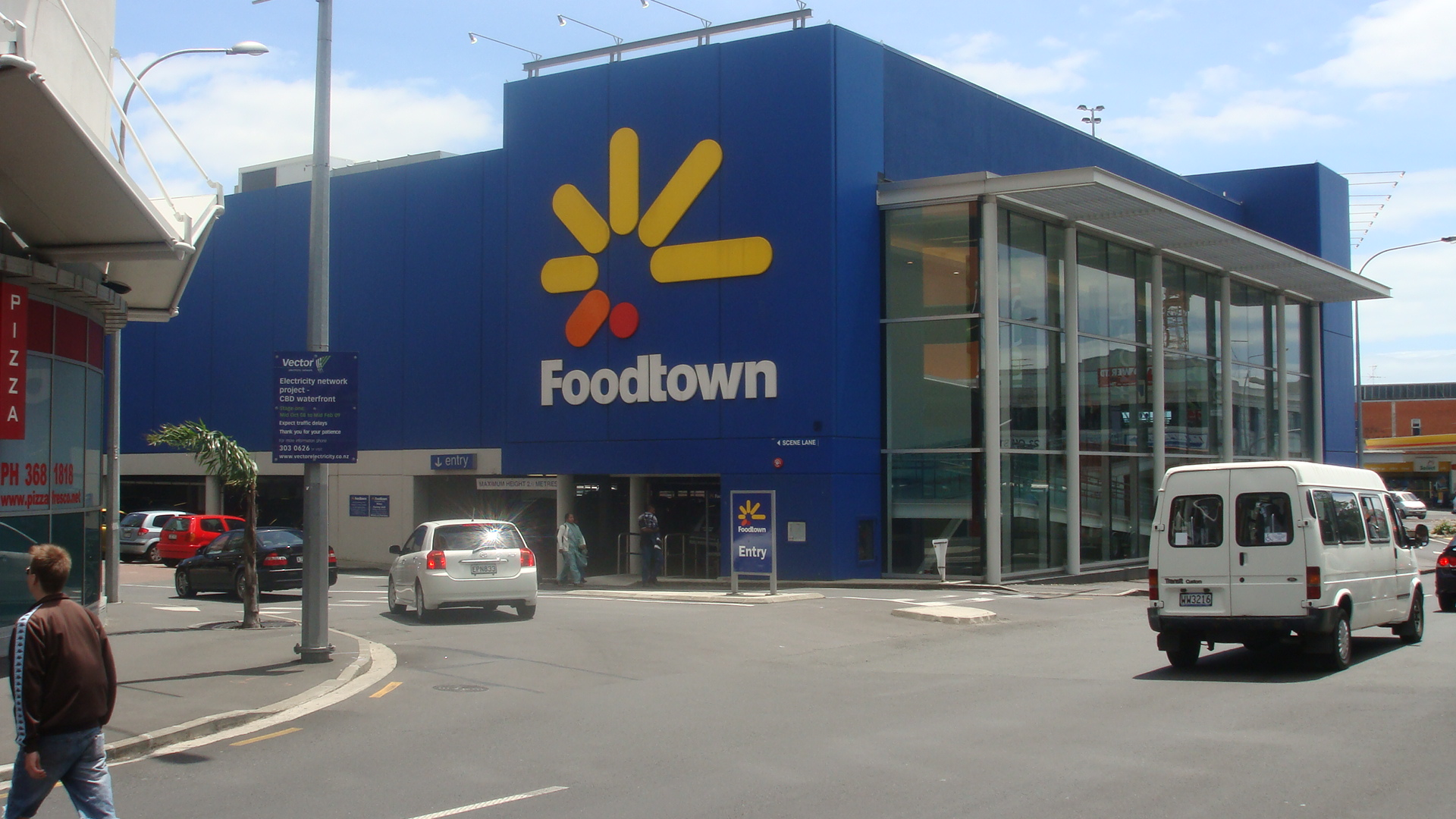
- Foodtown, Central Auckland, 2008
- Type: Subsidiary
- Industry: Retail
- Founded: 1958; 68 years ago
- Founder: Progressive Enterprises
- Defunct: 13 November 2011; 15 years ago
- Fate: Rebranded to Countdown
- Successor: Countdown (spun-off)
- Headquarters: Auckland, New Zealand
- Number of locations: 33 (2008)
- Area served: New Zealand
- Products: List of Brands
- Owner: Woolworths Group
- Parent: Progressive Enterprises
- Website: www.foodtown.co.nz

Foodtown was a New Zealand supermarket chain owned by Progressive Enterprises (now Woolworths New Zealand). As with Woolworths, the Foodtown brand was phased out in the late 2000s, with all stores rebranded as Countdown by the end of 2011. Foodtown supermarkets were typically integrated with a shopping centre; the chain had few stand-alone stores.

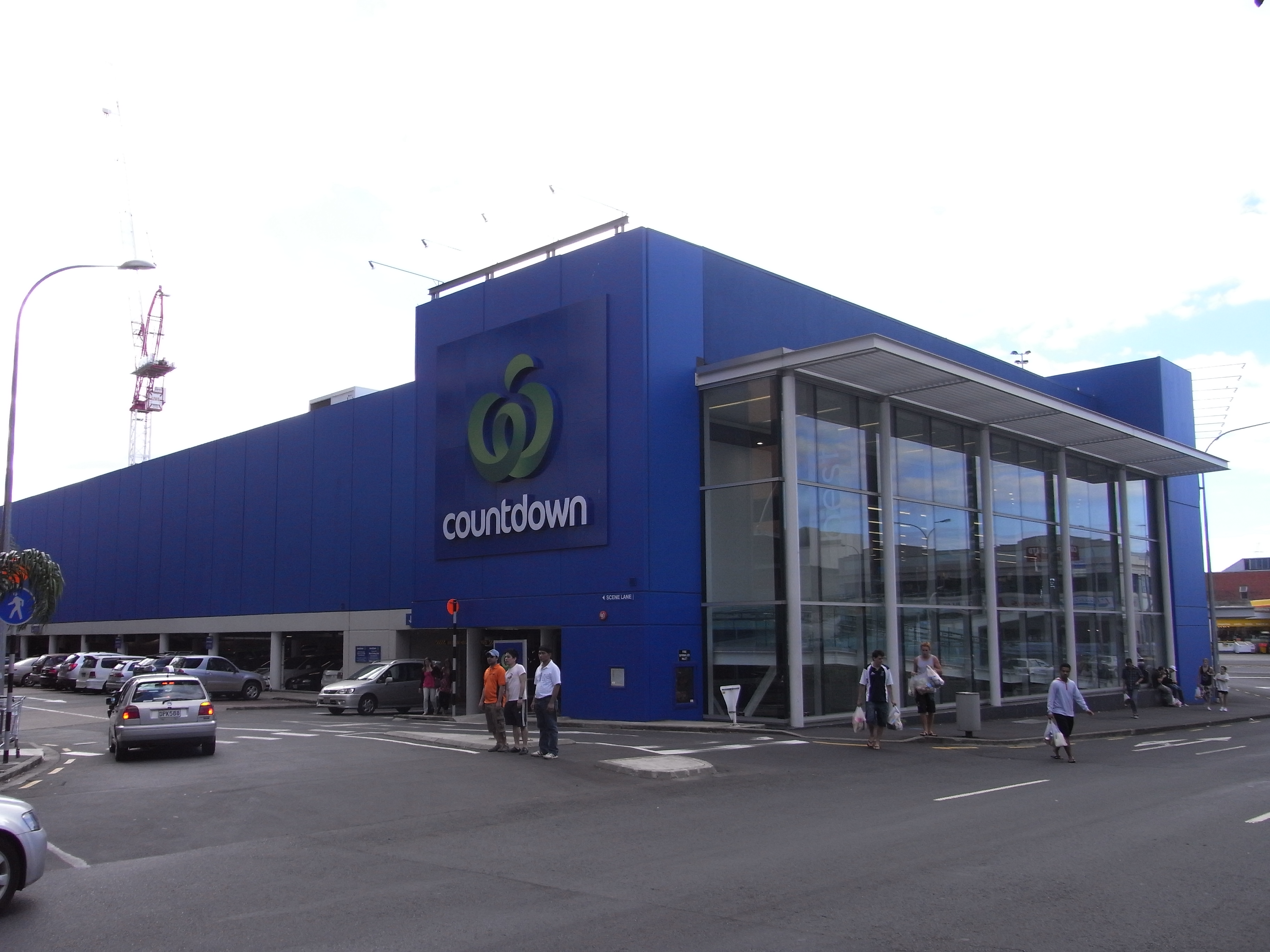
Foodtown Central Auckland, rebranded as Countdown in 2010

== History ==
=== 1958–1961 Foodtown Supermarkets Limited ===
On 18 June 1958, the first Foodtown supermarket of 1,400 square metres was opened on a 1.1-hectare site at Ōtāhuhu. Three small business owners – Tom Ah Chee, Norman Kent, and John Brown – sold their small businesses and pooled their resources to personally build and supervise construction of New Zealand's first American-style supermarket. The Ōtāhuhu supermarket proved a success and a second Foodtown was built and opened in Takanini, South Auckland in 1961.

=== 1961–1988 Progressive Enterprises ===
In 1961 the company was restructured when the Picot family joined the business. Their family company, Progressive Enterprises, contributed an equal amount of capital to that accumulated by the three original partners and became the parent company to Foodtown Supermarkets Limited.

=== 1988–1992 Coles Myer Limited ===
In March 1988 Progressive Enterprises became part of the Australian company Coles Myer. During this time it saw the expansion of the Foodtown chain to areas outside Auckland (Hamilton, Wellington, Tauranga, Palmerston North, Wanganui and New Plymouth) and also saw greater expansion within the wider Auckland area.

=== 1992–1994 Progressive Enterprises – public company ===
In April 1992 Coles Myer relaunched Progressive Enterprises onto the New Zealand stock exchange as a public company. During this time no new Foodtown supermarkets were opened.

=== 1993–2005 Progressive Enterprises – Foodland Associated Limited ===
In October 1993 Foodland Associated Limited (FAL) bought the majority shareholding from Coles Myer and shortly after bought all remaining public shares and delisted Progressive from the New Zealand stock exchange. With this purchase Progressive Enterprises became the parent company for a number of FAL brands. Progressive Enterprises consisted of: Foodtown Supermarkets, Countdown, 3 Guys, Georgie Pie Restaurant, Rattrays and SuperValue.

On 17 June 2002 Progressive Enterprises Ltd bought Woolworths (NZ) Ltd from Hong Kong–based owners Dairy Farm Group. The sale saw Progressive's supermarket brands Foodtown, Countdown, 3 Guys, SuperValue and FreshChoice joined by Woolworths, Big Fresh and Price Chopper. As a result, PEL increased its share of the NZ grocery market to approximately 45%.

Foodtown was the first supermarket in New Zealand to launch a loyalty card called the "Foodtown Card", which offered exclusive discounts and competitions to cardholders. This was renamed in 2003 after the merger of Progressive and Woolworths (NZ) Ltd as the "Foodtown Woolworths onecard".

In 2004, there were 28 Foodtown stores.

=== 2005–2011 Progressive Enterprises – Woolworths Limited ===
On 24 November 2005 Australian company Woolworths purchased Progressive Enterprises Limited from Foodland Associated Limited.

In October 2006, Progressive Enterprises announced a discount fuel scheme with Gull Petroleum and Shell to offer discounts on petrol when shoppers spent $40 or more in their Woolworths, Foodtown or Countdown Stores. This scheme was similar to the one their parent company Woolworths Limited offered in Australia.

In 2008, there were 33 Foodtown stores including 29 in Auckland.

In 2008, Progressive Enterprises announced their intention to phase out the Foodtown brand. Existing Foodtown locations were to be rebranded as Countdown over a 5-year period, as each store was to receive periodic upgrades. No existing Foodtown stores were to be closed as a result of this – although the store in Cameron Road, Tauranga, which was situated almost directly opposite a Countdown store, closed on 1 May 2011 due to "dwindling profits". In some areas, the location of a Foodtown near a Countdown resulted in two Countdowns close to each other, sometimes 100m. For example, a Countdown exists in the Manukau City Mall located at Westfield Manukau as well as in the stand-alone Manukau branch located on Great South Road. Another notable mention is the Countdowns in Highland Park, where there are Countdowns within 100m of each other. Another example is at Westfield Glenfield which has two Countdowns almost directly opposite each other, one of them being a converted Foodtown.

On 14 November 2011, the last Foodtown, at Browns Bay, was rebranded to Countdown, bringing an end to the iconic New Zealand brand.

== Private label brands ==
- Basics – replaced by Homebrand in 2005
- Signature Range
- Woolworths Select
- Woolworths Home Brand
- Woolworths Naytura
- Woolworths Freefrom
- Woolworths Essentials

== See also ==
- Foodtown Supermarkets Ltd v Commerce Commission
- Woolworths (New Zealand)
- Woolworths (Australia)
- Big Fresh
- Price Chopper
