= Woolworths (New Zealand) =

Supermarket chain

Woolworths New Zealand Limited
- Logo used since 2023

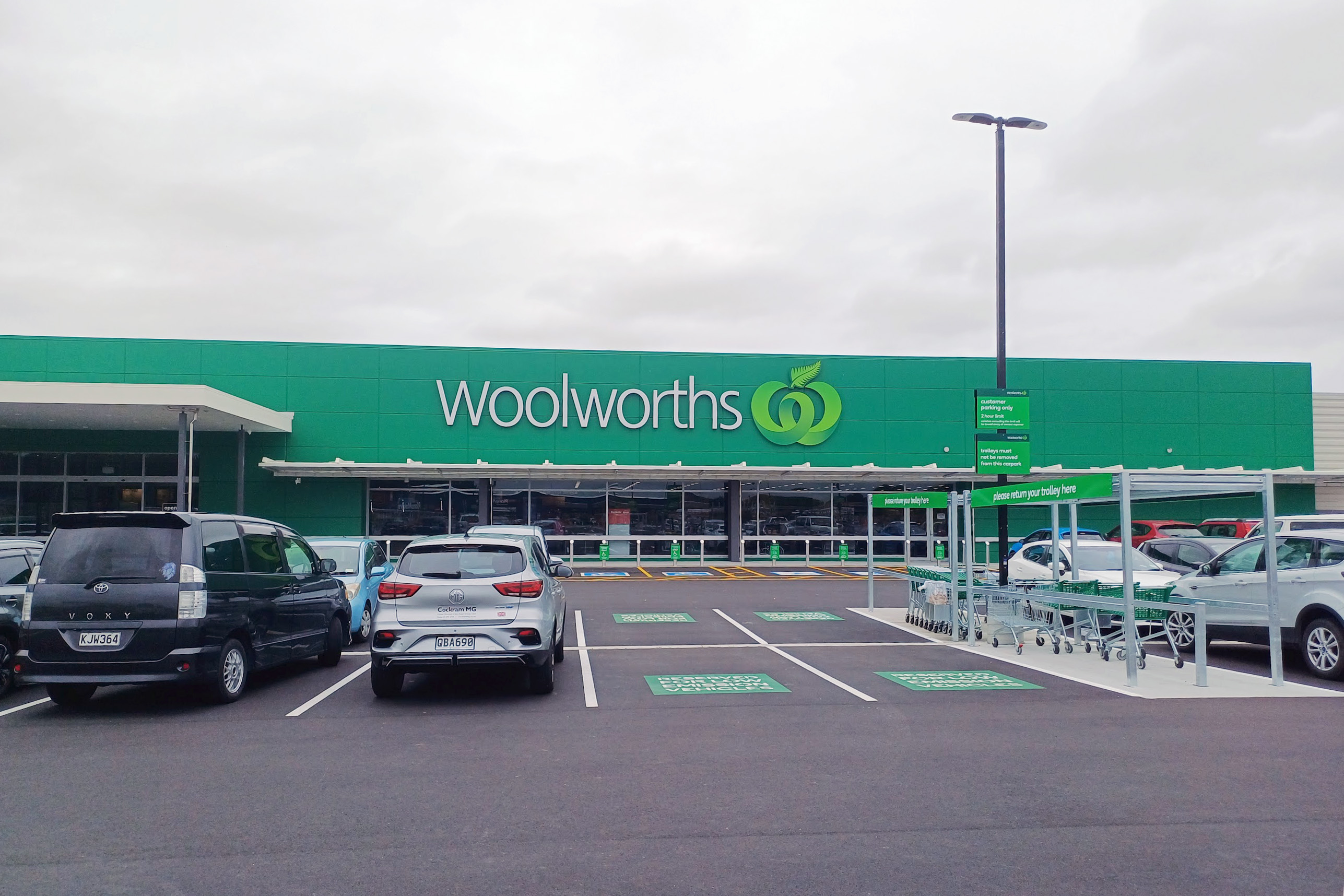
- The first location rebranded to Woolworths, in Waimak Junction, Kaiapoi
- Type: Subsidiary
- Industry: Retail
- Predecessors: Countdown
- Founded: 1929; 97 years ago (original); 2023; 3 years ago (revival)
- Defunct: 2011; 15 years ago (original)
- Number of locations: 187 stores (2025)
- Owner: Woolworths Group
- Subsidiaries: FreshChoice; SuperValue; NZ Grocery Wholesalers
- Website: woolworths.co.nz

Woolworths New Zealand Limited is a supermarket chain, owned by Woolworths Group in Australia.

In 1929, Woolworths was established in New Zealand by Percy Christmas as a general merchandise retailer, and gradually became a supermarket chain. The chain's name was inspired by the original Woolworth in the United States, and Woolworths in Australia, though was unrelated to either retailer.

In 1979, Woolworths was sold to L.D. Nathan, who created Price Chopper and Big Fresh, sister brands to Woolworths. In 1990, Dairy Farm International acquired Woolworths, before selling to Progressive Enterprises in 2002. In 2005, Woolworths Group in Australia acquired Progressive Enterprises, which included a number of other New Zealand supermarket chains, such as Countdown. In 2009, Woolworths Group announced that Woolworths supermarkets would be rebranded to Countdown, with this completing in November 2011.

In 2023, it was announced that all Countdown supermarkets would all be rebranded to Woolworths, with this completing in December 2025.

== History ==
=== Woolworths (1929–1979) ===
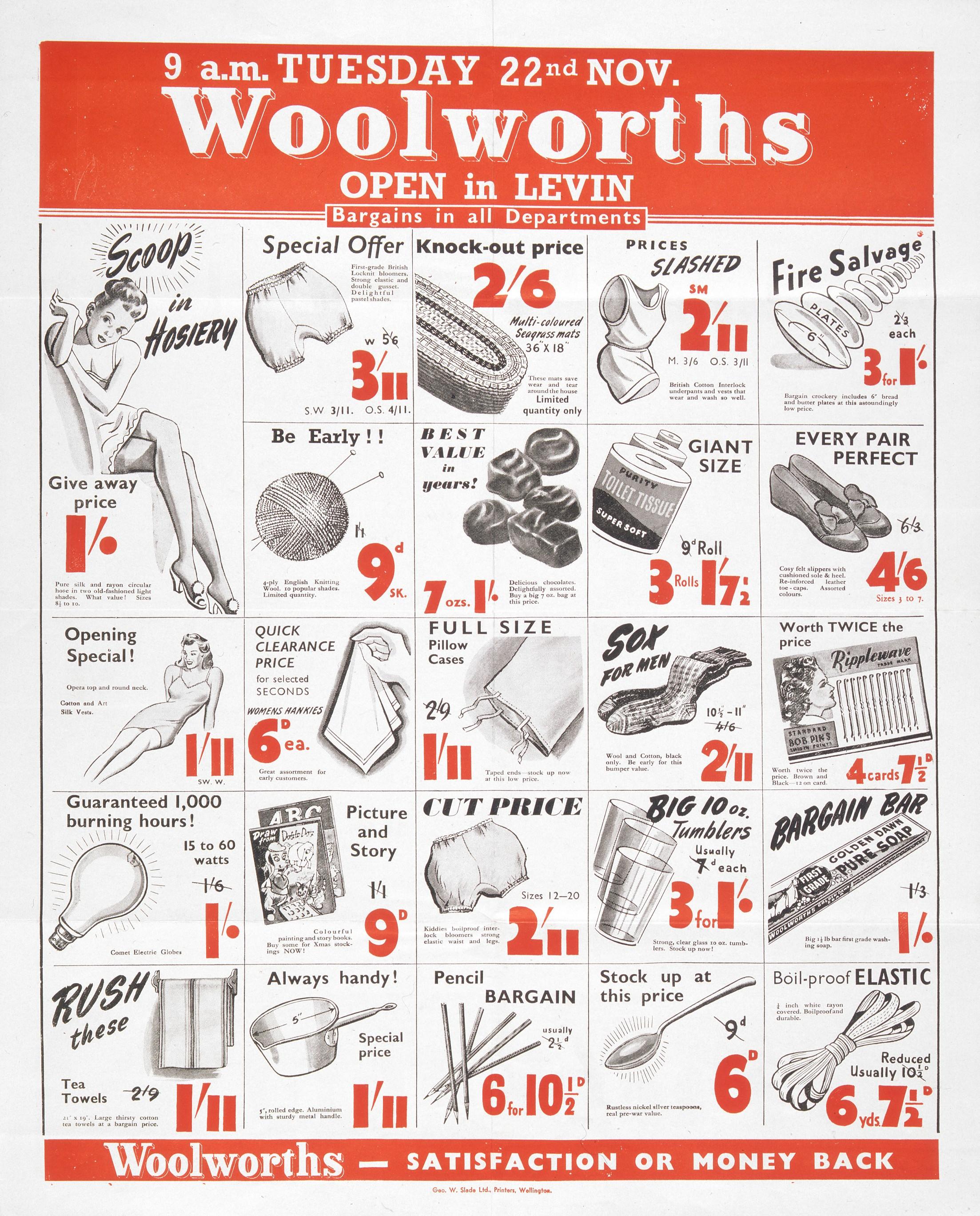
Woolworths advertisement, Levin, 1949

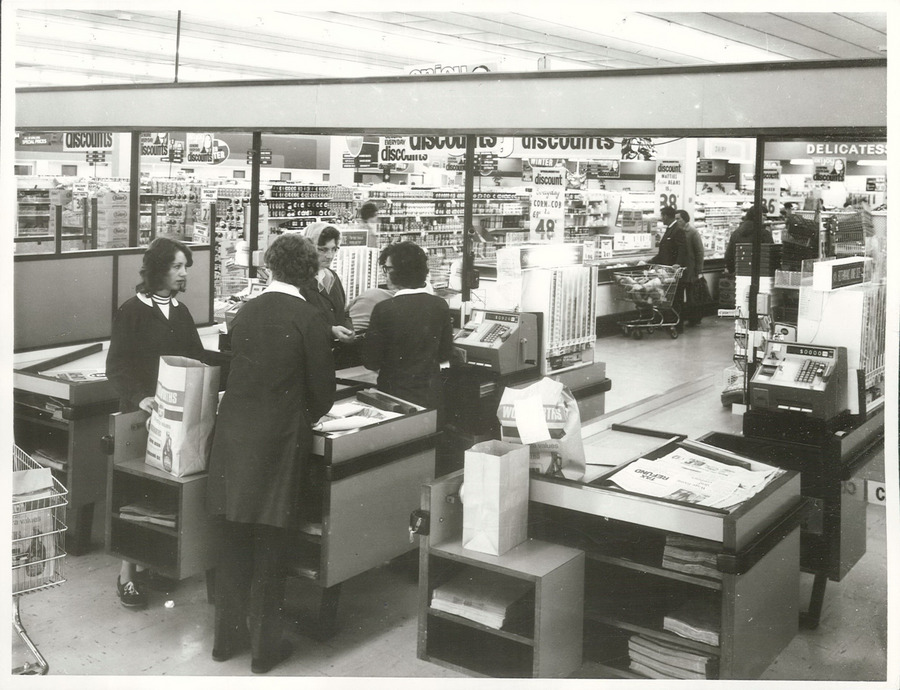
Woolworths Supermarket, Upper Hutt, 1974

Percy Christmas opened the first Woolworths store on Cuba Street, Wellington in 1929. It expanded into a chain of stores, initially selling general merchandise.

In 1963, Milne & Choyce, Farmers and Woolworths formed a joint venture to establish New Zealand's first shopping mall in New Lynn, Auckland. All three companies established anchor stores in the new mall.

Woolworths opened the first supermarket in Hastings in 1965.

Woolworths acquired the Self Help grocery chain in the early 1970s and began to rebrand these as Woolworths in 1973.

=== L.D. Nathan (1979–1990) ===
L.D. Nathan, the owner of the Super Value supermarket chain, purchased Woolworths for $12 million in 1979.

L.D. Nathan acquired 70 McKenzies general merchandise stores in 1980, rebranding the stores as Woolworths.

The general merchandise stores were rebranded as DEKA in 1988.

L. D. Nathan established the discount supermarket chain Price Chopper in 1987, and the Big Fresh supermarket chain in 1988.

=== Dairy Farm International (1990–2002) ===
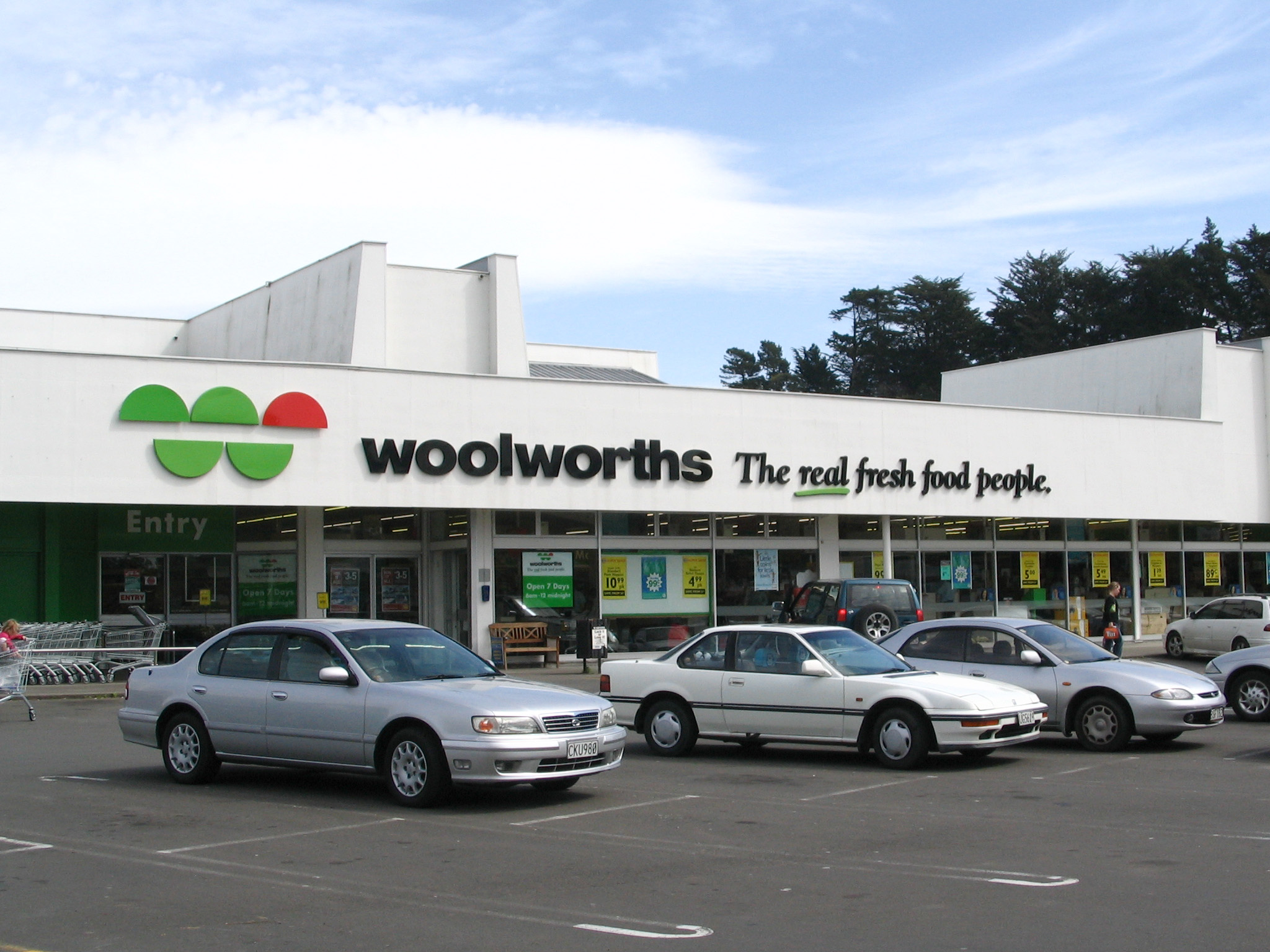
Woolworths Wanganui, 2006

In 1990, Hong Kong's Dairy Farm International acquired the Woolworths New Zealand business, consisting of Woolworths, Price Chopper and Big Fresh chains.

Woolworths launched New Zealand's first online supermarket in 1996.

Between 1990 and 2000, Woolworths trialled a network of min-supermarkets in BP petrol stations. In 2001, Woolworths began operating mini-supermarkets at 17 Gull New Zealand stores.

Progressive Enterprises, the owner of Foodtown, Countdown, SuperValue and FreshChoice, made a bid to purchase Woolworths New Zealand in May 2001. The merger application was cleared by the Commerce Commission but then withdrawn following court action by rival Foodstuffs.

Progressive made another application for the merger in October 2001. The Commerce Commission declined the application in December 2001. Australia's Woolworths Group also expressed interest in acquiring the company.

By 2002, Woolworths New Zealand consisted of 83 supermarkets branded as Woolworths, Big Fresh and Price Chopper. It was the country's third-largest supermarket group, with a market share of about 20%.

=== Progressive Enterprises (2002–2005) ===
In April 2002, Progressive Enterprises convinced the Judicial Committee of the Privy Council to uphold the Commerce Commission's clearance of the original merger application. Dairy Farm International agreed to the sale, and the merger proceeded later in 2002.

In 2003, there were 59 full-format Woolworths stores, including 17 in Auckland. There were also 26 Woolworths mini-supermarkets, including 14 in Auckland.

Progressive Enterprises launched its onecard loyalty card in 2003, based on the Foodtown loyalty card launched in 1994.

=== Woolworths Group (2005–2011) ===
Australia's Woolworths Group acquired Progressive Enterprises in 2005, including the Woolworths chain. In 2006, company workers at three distribution centres initiated industrial action in an attempt to win a collective employment agreement and pay rise. The company responded by suspending grocery distribution centre operations and allowing suppliers to send stock directly to supermarkets.

In October 2006, Woolworths began operating fuel discount vouchers for Z Energy and Gull New Zealand.

In 2008, Woolworths had 61 full-format stores, including 10 in Auckland. It also had 18 mini-supermarkets at Gull New Zealand petrol stations, including 11 in Auckland.

In 2008 Progressive Enterprises approached its 943 New Zealand suppliers (which Woolworths calls "Trade Partners") to use electronic commerce or EDI to integrate supply chain orders (such as Purchase Orders and Invoices) in the same way that Woolworths does in Australia.

In September 2009, it was announced that the Woolworths brand would almost cease to exist as most of the stores would be rebranded as Countdown over a five-year period.

By August 2010, the Woolworths brand had ceased to exist in the South Island. On 14 November 2011, the Meadowlands store in Howick, Auckland was rebranded as Countdown, marking the official end of the Woolworths brand. In August 2011, Progressive Enterprises won a marketing award.

The 21 Woolworths mini-supermarkets at Gull petrol stations were taken over by Night 'n Day from June 2011.

In November 2011, the final Woolworths was converted to Countdown. There was one exception, Woolworths Bayfair in Mount Maunganui continued to operate under the Woolworths brand.

=== Reversion to Woolworths brand (2023–present) ===
In July 2023, it was announced that all Countdown stores would be reverting to the Woolworths brand as part of a $400 million transformation. This would include the New Zealand Grocery Wholesalers division, that was created following the release of a Commerce Commission report on competition in the New Zealand grocery sector. The government had given Countdown one year to establish substantial wholesale agreements or face additional regulation.

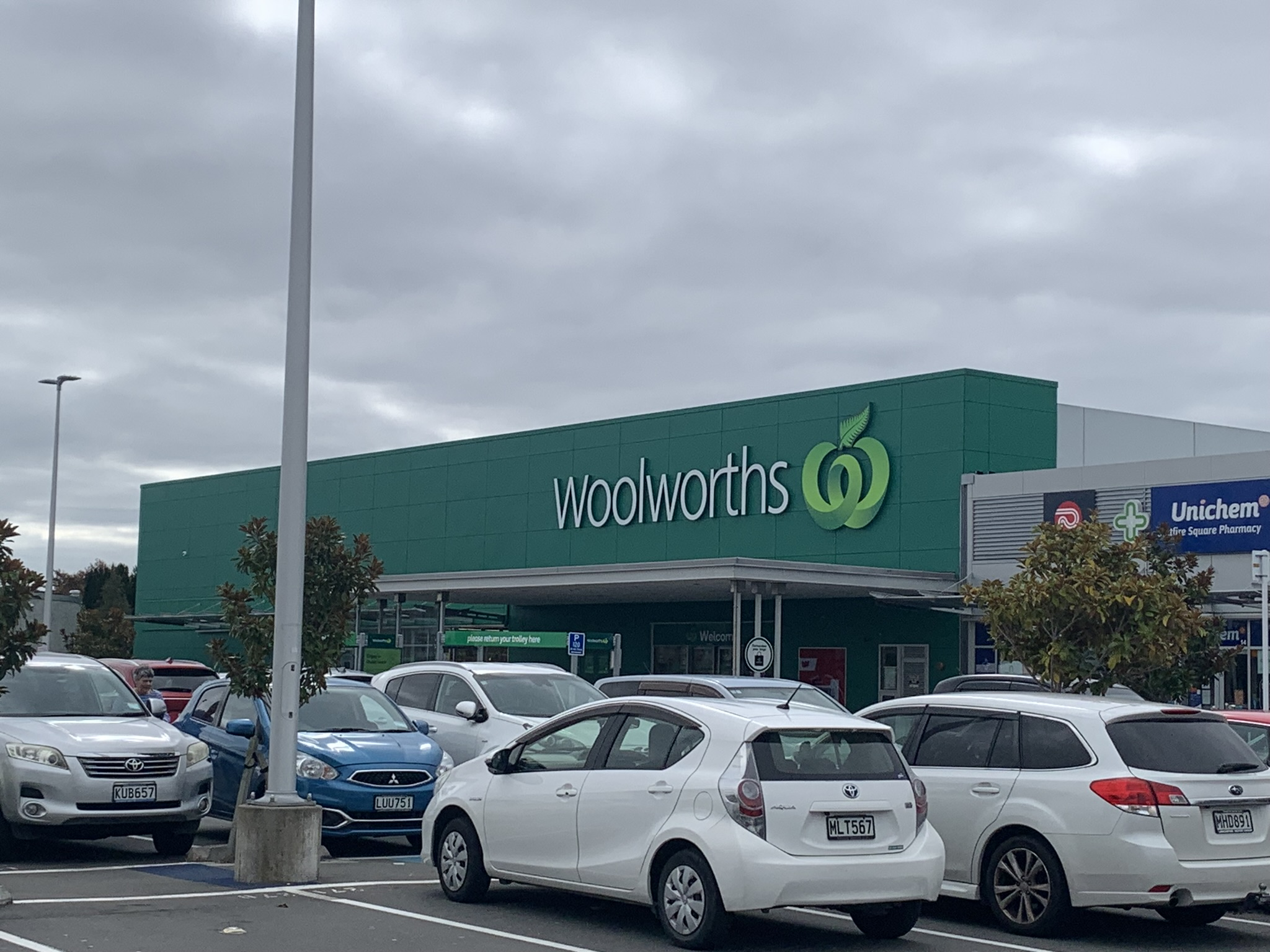
The Countdown location at Christchurch Airport, having been rebranded to Woolworths

The Countdown store in Bethlehem, a suburb of Tauranga, which originally opened in 2003, reopened on 17 August 2023 after renovations. This store became the first to be rebranded as Woolworths.

In early February 2024 Woolworths replaced its loyalty schemes Onecard and Onecard Visa with Everyday Rewards. Consumer NZ head of research and advocacy Gemma Rasmussen expressed concern that Everyday Rewards and other supermarket loyalty schemes were not as cheap as they were marketed to be and said that they discouraged competition. During its launch, customers were awarded points upon account creation, and points were able to be gifted to other people. Some customers exploited this by creating several fake accounts and gifting their main account.

On 10 September 2024, thousands of union-affiliated Woolworths supermarket workers staged a nationwide strike to demand better wages and working conditions. On 16 December, Woolworths signed a new collective bargaining agreement with First Union, giving union-affiliated employees a 6.8 percent pay rise over a two-year period.

Woolworths confirmed it was undergoing a business retail restructure in April 2025.

On 6 May 2025, the Commerce Commission files criminal charges against Woolworths New Zealand for alleged inaccurate pricing and misleading discounts.

In December 2025, Countdown Botany became the final Countdown to be rebranded as Woolworths.

== Operations ==
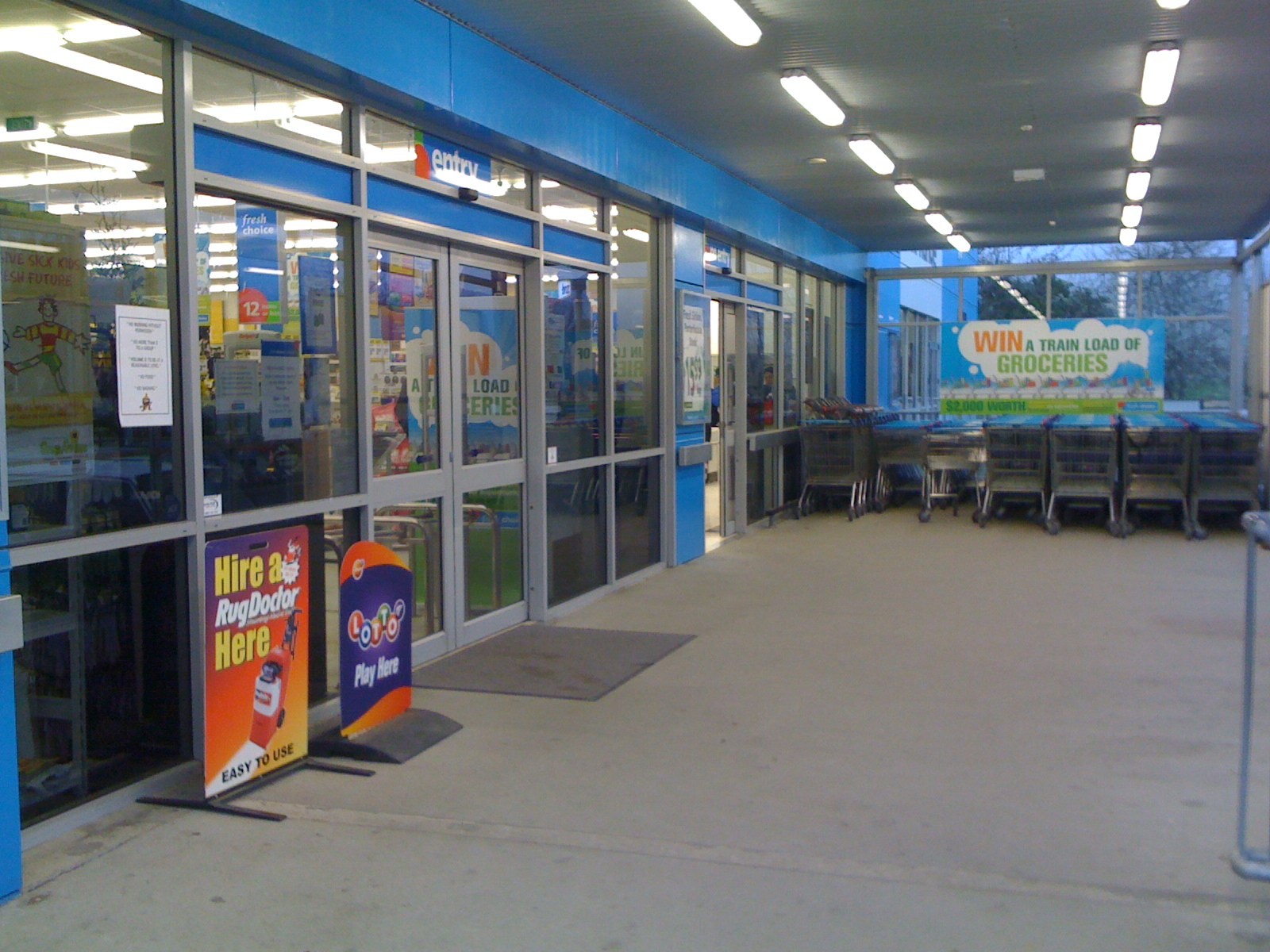
Entrance to a Fresh Choice supermarket

=== Current store formats ===
Woolworths NZ runs the following grocery store chains:

- Woolworths: 191 supermarket stores
- SuperValue: 4 stores – convenience supermarket stores, run as a franchise
- FreshChoice: 74 stores – Higher quality supermarket with a large range, run as a franchise

It operates online grocery shopping in the name of Woolworths (formerly Countdown).

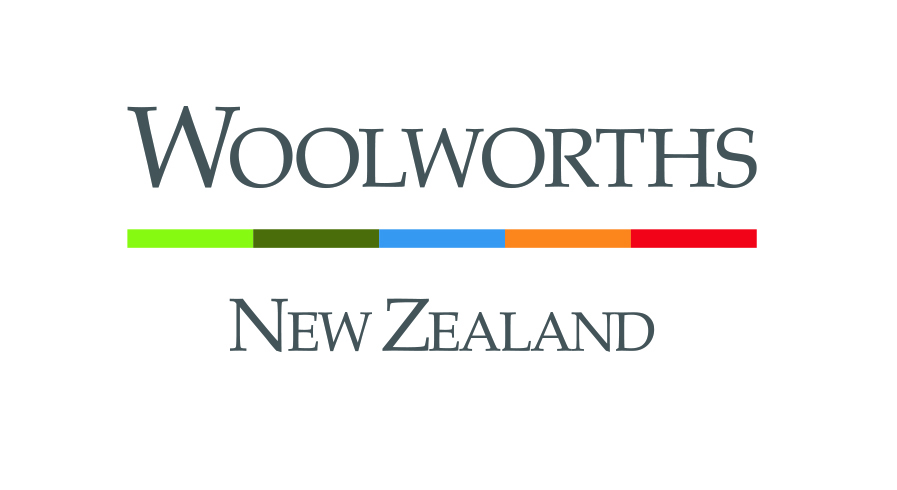
Logo used from 2018–2022

=== Defunct store formats ===
- 3 Guys (also known as Gubays)
- Big Fresh
- Price Chopper
- Georgie Pie – A fast food chain, sold to McDonald's New Zealand in 1996
- Foodtown – The Foodtown brand was phased out in early 2012.
- Countdown – The name used in most locations until the 2023 rebrand.

== See also ==
- Supermarkets in New Zealand
- 2006 Progressive Enterprises dispute (pay dispute resulting in industrial action at several distribution centres)
