= Everyday Rewards =

Australian and New Zealand customer loyalty program

- Type: Loyalty program
- Owner: Woolworths Group
- Area served: Australia, New Zealand
- Introduced: 2007; 19 years ago
- Accrual partners: Woolworths; BWS; Big W; MyDeal; Big W Market; Everyday Market; Bupa; Origin Energy; Ampol; EG Australia; Woolworths; BP (New Zealand); ASB Bank; Petstock; FreshChoice
- Website: everyday.com.au, everydayrewards.co.nz

Everyday Rewards, known as Woolworths Rewards between 2015 and 2020, is a customer loyalty program owned and operated in Australia and New Zealand by Woolworths Group. Members can earn points in the program from Woolworths Group companies (Woolworths, Big W, BWS, MyDeal, Everyday Market, BigW Market etc), as well as partner brands like Ampol, Bupa and Origin Energy. Qantas Frequent Flyer program members can convert 2,000 Everyday Rewards points to 1,000 Frequent Flyer points as part of a partnership between the two companies.

As of August 2023, Everyday Rewards has over 14.5 million members. As of November 2024, there are 1.8 million active members in New Zealand. Members can access their Everyday Rewards card through the app, by adding it to digital wallets like Google Wallet, or by ordering a physical card online. Accrued points can then by redeemed at Woolworths Group stores (at a rate of 2,000 points for an A$10 discount), or converted to 1,000 Qantas Frequent Flyer points. Spending A$30 or more in a Woolworths Supermarket also gives a 4c/litre fuel discount voucher at participating Ampol or EG Australia branded outlets.

== History ==
Everyday Rewards was first trialled in Central West, New South Wales from September 2007. This followed Woolworths' announcement that it was planning to launch a general purpose credit card in 2008, the Everyday Money credit card.

During the NSW trial, 50,000 cards were issued to customers. In February 2008, Woolworths announced that following the NSW trial, Everyday Rewards would be rolled out nationally, beginning with South Australia and the Northern Territory in mid-February, and to other states by the end of May 2008.

Woolworths stated in June 2008 that "well over a million" shoppers had taken a card and registered their details. In July 2008, Woolworths stated that the program had exceeded expectations, with more than three million cards on issue.

In May 2012, Woolworths started offering in-store discounts to Everyday Rewards members who use the card.

On 26 October 2015 Woolworths announced that, from 1 January 2016, customer loyalty cards would no longer earn Qantas Frequent Flyer points. Instead they will receive more discounts on groceries. The new discount program came into effect on 28 October 2015. Everyday Rewards cardholders will be sent new 'Woolworths Rewards' cards.

In April 2016, doubts were expressed over the effectiveness of the new program with claims by analysts that the program has not gained traction in the community and is possibly a cause of the slow down in supermarket sales growth which has slowed to 3 per cent.

On 29 July 2020, Woolworths Rewards rebranded as Everyday Rewards. Everyday Rewards was launched in Tasmania on 6 August 2020 replacing the Frequent Shopper Club loyalty program in the state which would be phased out by 2021. The Frequent Shopper Club was Purity Supermarket's loyalty program which Woolworths retained after its purchase of the chain due to an arrangement with Purity and because of its popularity.

In June 2022, Woolworths began a limited trial of Everyday Extra, a subscription service offering additional benefits for Everyday Rewards members who pay a monthly or annual fee. The program was launched to all members in October 2022. The subscription initially offered a montlhy discount at both Woolworths and Big W stores. In June 2025 the Big W monthly discount was dropped with "reduced prices on thousands of products" cited as the reason. Many subscribers were frustrated and angered at this decision.

In August 2023, Woolworths introduced Member Prices, giving Everyday Rewards members access to offers and lower prices on certain products in-store and online.

In February 2024, Everyday Rewards replaced Onecard as the loyalty scheme at Countdown and Woolworths supermarkets in New Zealand. A partnership with Westpac and its St.George Bank, Bank of Melbourne and BankSA subsidiaries in October 2024 allowed members of their Altitude and Amplify Rewards programs to convert their points to Everyday Rewards points. In November 2024, Woolworths added the Everyday Rewards Shop to the Everyday Rewards app, allowing members to purchase products using their Everyday Rewards dollars. From December 2024, partnerships with Air New Zealand and Qantas allowed New Zealand Everyday Rewards members to convert their Everyday Rewards points to Airpoints Dollars or Qantas Points.

In mid-October 2025, the FreshChoice supermarket chain joined the Everyday Rewards program.

== Qantas Frequent Flyer program ==
In December 2008, Woolworths and Qantas entered into a six-year agreement to allow Everyday Rewards members to earn Qantas Frequent Flyer (QFF) points for purchases at Woolworths supermarkets. In June 2009, details of the arrangement were announced. Under the arrangement Everyday Rewards members would earn one Qantas Frequent Flyer point for each dollar over $30 spent in one transaction at Woolworths (or Safeway) supermarkets (excluding Tasmania) or Woolworths liquor stores. To earn these points Everyday Rewards members would need to also have and link a QFF account, and the QFF joining fees were waived for new QFF members. Woolworths was to pay the QFF program for QFF points earned by members under the arrangement.

The program was later expanded to include some of Woolworths Limited's other stores including Big W and BWS.

In August 2009, of 3.8 million Everyday Rewards cards "registered", 1.2 million were linked to a QFF account, which increased by August 2010, to 5.1 million cards registered, of which 2.7 million were linked to a QFF account.

On 26 October 2015, Woolworths announced it is splitting with Qantas to revamp its Everyday Rewards Program.

== See also ==
- Flybuys, the loyalty program run by the competing Coles Group and Wesfarmers
