= Self Help (grocery shop) =

Defunct New Zealand grocery shop chain

Self Help Co-operative Limited was a New Zealand chain of grocery shops founded in 1922 by Benjamin Sutherland in Wellington. There were 200 Self Help shops in 1947, making it the largest grocery company in New Zealand at the time.

== History ==
Self Help Co-operative Limited was founded on 27 October 1922 by Benjamin Sutherland in Wellington. After a year there seven Self Help shops in Wellington, 18 in 1926 and 56 nationwide in 1929. In 1947 it had 200 shops, making it the largest grocery company in New Zealand. In 1932, to celebrate Self Help's 10th anniversary, the company started a staff benefit fund.

In the 1920s Self Help created a baking powder and used the slogan "Bound to Rise" to market it, which was similar to the "Sure to Rise" slogan of Edmonds baking powder, which was a trademark of Edmonds. Edmonds took legal action, but in 1931 it was found that there was no trademark infringement. In the 1930s Self Help created an own brand, which included soaps, jellies and custard powders. During the Second World War Self Help provided "Wartime Cooking Suggestions".

In 1956 Sir Edmund Hillary and Selwyn Toogood attended the opening of the Self Help shop in Lambton Quay, in Wellington.

In July 1973 Woolworths bought 12 Self Help shops in Auckland, Hamilton, Te Awamutu and Rotorua.

== Operations ==
Unlike most grocery shops, Self Help did not offer credit or delivery services. In order to reduce costs, it purchased goods in bulk and did not offer wrapping services, meaning that customers had to bring their own wrapping paper and string. Self Help was the first self-service grocery chain in New Zealand.

Self Help did not engage in price fixing, despite it being done by several businesses that comprised the Proprietary Articles Trade Association. Sutherland brought the association to court in 1927, successfully claiming that its price fixing activities were illegal. Sutherland made a similar anti-price fixing move in 1931.

== See also ==
- Supermarkets in New Zealand
