= Qantas Frequent Flyer =

Airline frequent flyer program

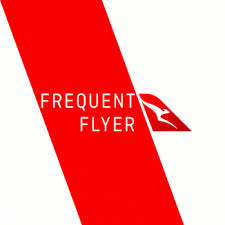
- Type: Subsidiary
- Industry: Loyalty marketing
- Founded: 1987
- Headquarters: Sydney, Australia
- Area served: Worldwide
- Key people: Andrew Glance (CEO of Qantas Loyalty)
- Parent: Qantas
- Website: www.qantas.com

Qantas Frequent Flyer is the frequent-flyer program of Australian airline Qantas. Established in 1987, it is administered by Qantas Loyalty, a Qantas Group company, and as of June 2026 had 18.9 million members. Members earn Qantas Points on flights with Qantas, Jetstar and partner airlines, including members of the Oneworld alliance, and through non-airline partners such as credit card issuers and retailers. Points can be redeemed for flights, upgrades and other rewards. Status credits, earned mainly from flying, determine a member's tier, which can bring benefits such as airport lounge access.

Qantas Loyalty's core business is selling points to partner companies, which award them to their customers. In the 2024–25 financial year it generated about 12 per cent of the Qantas Group's revenue but 23 per cent of its earnings, and in 2025–26 it reported underlying earnings before interest and tax of A$625 million. The program has been criticised over the scarcity of reward seats and increases in the number of points needed for rewards. It was examined in a 2019 review of loyalty schemes by the Australian Competition and Consumer Commission (ACCC), and more than 100 people raised concerns about it with a 2023 Senate inquiry. Members' details were among the customer data exposed in a 2025 cyber-attack affecting Qantas. The invitation-only Chairman's Lounge, offered to federal politicians and many senior public officials, has been criticised as a potential means of influencing decision-makers; former Qantas chief executive Alan Joyce has rejected claims that the airline exercised influence through it.

== History ==
=== Origins and early growth ===
Qantas Frequent Flyer was launched in 1987. It was established while John Menadue was chief executive, when Qantas flew only international routes, and members were initially encouraged to redeem their awards for luxury goods for the home and personal use. Within a year it had about 50,000 members, most of them business travellers. After Qantas acquired the domestic carrier Australian Airlines in 1992, members could also earn points on domestic flights. American Express became the program's first credit card partner in 1993, and membership reached 2.4 million by 2000. Qantas was a founding member of the Oneworld airline alliance, launched in 1999, which extended members' benefits to other member airlines. In 2001 the program was relaunched with Bronze, Silver, Gold and Platinum tiers, and the fixed validity period for points was replaced by a rule under which points expire only after 18 months without account activity.

=== 2008 overhaul and proposed sale ===
In March 2008, an analyst at JPMorgan Chase suggested that the Qantas frequent-flyer program could be worth A$2 billion (US$1.9 billion), representing more than a quarter of the total market value of Qantas.

On 1 July 2008 a major overhaul of the program was announced. The two key new features of the program were Any Seat rewards, in which members could now redeem any seat on an aircraft, rather than just selected seats — at a price. The second new feature was Points Plus Pay, which has enabled members to use a combination of cash and points to redeem an award. Additionally, the Frequent Flyer store was also expanded to include a greater range of products and services.

Announcing the revamp, Qantas confirmed it would be seeking to raise about A$1 billion in 2008 by selling up to 40% of the frequent flyer program. However, in September 2008, it stated it would defer the float, citing volatile market conditions.

After deferring the float, Qantas held exploratory talks with private equity firms about selling a stake in the business. It had also renegotiated its agreements with the banks that issued points-earning credit cards, so that cardholders would earn Qantas Points directly rather than through the banks' own reward schemes. Cardholders had until 31 March 2009 to transfer points from those schemes to Qantas Frequent Flyer if they wanted to keep redeeming them through the program, a change that some cardholders resented and that rival Virgin Blue campaigned against. Qantas again considered floating part of the loyalty business during a strategic review in 2013 and 2014, but in August 2014 chief executive Alan Joyce said a sale was off the table.

=== Woolworths partnership ===
In December 2008, Woolworths and Qantas entered into a six-year agreement to allow Everyday Rewards members to earn Qantas Frequent Flyer points for purchases at Woolworths. In June 2009, details of the arrangement were announced. Under the arrangement Everyday Rewards members would earn one Qantas Frequent Flyer point for each dollar over $30 spent in one transaction at Woolworths (or Safeway) supermarkets (excluding Tasmania) or Woolworths liquor stores. To earn these points Everyday Rewards members would need to also have and link a Qantas account, with the joining fees waived for new members. Woolworths was to pay the Qantas program for points earned by members under the arrangement.

The program was later expanded to include some of Woolworths's other stores including Big W and BWS. From October 2009, cardholders could collect one point per dollar for every dollar over $50 spent in one transaction at Dick Smith and Tandy, however those stores' participation stopped in September 2012.

In August 2009, of 3.8 million Everyday Rewards cards "registered", 1.2 million were linked to a Qantas account, which increased by August 2010, to 5.1 million cards registered, of which 2.7 million were linked to a Qantas account.

On 26 October 2015 Woolworths announced it was terminating its deal with Qantas to revamp its Everyday Rewards Program. By then the six-year arrangement was estimated to have added about 2 million members to Qantas Frequent Flyer, although about half of Everyday Rewards members had never linked their card to a Qantas account. Qantas was estimated to receive A$70–80 million a year from selling points to Woolworths.

On 15 December 2015, Woolworths Rewards announced a new partnership with Qantas Frequent Flyer giving customers the choice to convert their Woolworths Dollars, earned through buying orange ticket products, into Qantas points at a conversion rate of 870 Qantas points for every 10 Woolworths dollars.

On 22 August 2016, Woolworths Rewards announced that members would now have additional redemption options, including converting their savings to Qantas points.

On 1 October 2019, Woolworths Rewards increased the rate at which points are converted to Qantas Frequent Flyer points. Instead of 2,000 Woolworths Rewards points converting to 870 Qantas points, this increased to 1,000 Qantas points. Upon reaching 2,000 Woolworths Rewards points, those points would now be converted within 24 hours (rather than in blocks every 3 months).

=== 2010s ===
A higher Platinum One tier was added in 2011, when the program had just under 8 million members and annual revenue of about A$1 billion; membership passed 10 million in 2014. By 2017 Qantas Loyalty was the only Qantas business to have reported consecutive years of earnings growth since the airline's loss in 2012, including in periods when Qantas's international airline business was losing money. Qantas launched Aquire, a points program for small and medium-sized businesses, in 2014, and in 2017 introduced Qantas Business Rewards, under which businesses earn points when employees fly for work. From 1 July 2014, the points earned on Qantas flights depended on fare type as well as distance, with more expensive fares earning more, and members earned fewer status credits on flights with Oneworld partners. The US consultancy IdeaWorksCompany said the new structure added "daunting complexity".

In 2015 Qantas announced a health insurance venture with nib, Qantas Assure, under which members could earn points for buying health insurance and be rewarded for meeting fitness targets. In 2017 new limits on card interchange fees set by the Reserve Bank of Australia (RBA) took effect, and banks reduced the points earned on many credit cards; the same year, Qantas launched its own credit card with Citibank. After the 2017 changes, Qantas Loyalty's earnings went from double-digit growth to flat.

In June 2019 Joyce announced what he called the biggest overhaul in the program's history. The points needed for business- and first-class rewards and for upgrades increased for the first time in 15 years, while those needed for international economy rewards fell by up to 10 per cent. Carrier charges on international rewards were cut by up to half, one million extra reward seats were added, and Lifetime Platinum status was introduced for members who had earned 75,000 status credits. Points Club, which recognised members who earned large numbers of points outside flying, followed in 2020.

=== 2020s ===
During the COVID-19 pandemic, Qantas Loyalty relied on partnerships with other businesses to keep grounded members earning points, and in the 2020–21 financial year it was the only Qantas division to report positive earnings, with EBIT of A$272 million. Redemptions reached record levels as travel resumed; Qantas said about 7 billion points were redeemed on Classic Flight Rewards from mid-October to late November 2021. In August 2022 Qantas apologised for months of disruption at airports and offered all members a A$50 voucher for a Qantas flight, with status extensions and extra lounge invitations for higher-tier members. A Green tier, which rewarded members for activities such as offsetting the emissions from their flights, was introduced in 2022.

In January 2024 Qantas named Andrew Glance to succeed Olivia Wirth as chief executive of Qantas Loyalty. In April 2024 it launched Classic Plus, which added about 20 million reward seats on Qantas flights, priced in line with cash fares, alongside the roughly five million fixed-price Classic Reward seats offered each year; Qantas put the cost at A$120 million in the 2024–25 financial year. In January 2025 it announced that members would earn up to 25 per cent more points on domestic Qantas flights and that more reward seats would be offered on partner airlines, but that from 5 August 2025 more points would be needed for Classic Reward seats and Classic upgrades on Qantas flights, with most increases between 5 and 20 per cent; the points needed for reward seats on many Jetstar flights would fall. Qantas said it was the first increase in Classic Reward prices since 2019. In 2025 it began a partnership with department store David Jones, and in November 2025 it announced a A$199-a-year Club Jetstar membership under which frequent flyers can earn points, and up to 75 status credits a year, on Jetstar's cheapest fares; previously they earned points and status credits only on higher-priced Jetstar fares.

In February 2026 Qantas announced what it described as the "biggest changes to status in program history". From 8 December 2026 members will be able to roll over some unused status credits into the next membership year and to earn up to 140 status credits from everyday spending with program partners, and Qantas is retiring Points Club and the Green tier. From 2027 each tier will have a single status credit target for both attaining and retaining it, raising the number needed to retain Silver, Gold and Platinum status. In March 2026 Qantas said that Gold and Platinum members and holders of complimentary invitations would no longer have lounge access when travelling on Jetstar international flights, unless they booked Jetstar's highest fare class or a Qantas codeshare ticket, and that complimentary invitations could be transferred only to people on the same flight. The same month it introduced a search tool showing reward seat availability up to a year ahead.

Also in March 2026, the RBA announced that from 1 October 2026 it would ban surcharges on payments made with eftpos, Mastercard and Visa cards and cut the cap on interchange fees for domestic consumer credit card transactions from 0.8 to 0.3 per cent. Loyalty industry commentators expected banks to curb points earning because the change would leave them with less money to buy points, and several banks, including ANZ and NAB, subsequently cut sign-up bonuses or points-earning rates. In August 2026 the Commonwealth Bank announced a revamped Yello rewards program that would give customers more favourable rates for converting points to Velocity, the program of rival Virgin Australia, than to Qantas Frequent Flyer; Qantas said it was still discussing its participation. Qantas said banks would find other ways to fund the purchase of points and that its loyalty business was significantly more diversified than at the time of the RBA's 2017 changes, and in August 2026 said it had agreed revised commercial terms with its bank partners, including extensions of its five largest credit card agreements.

== Program ==
=== Membership and business model ===
Qantas Frequent Flyer is administered by Qantas Loyalty, a Qantas Group company. Joining costs A$99.50, although there are several ways of avoiding the fee, and a member's points expire if the account has had no earning or redemption activity for 18 consecutive months. Qantas Loyalty also runs Qantas Business Rewards, a program for small and medium-sized businesses that had 706,000 members in 2025–26, and offers Qantas-branded products including credit cards, home loans and insurance, as well as hotel and holiday bookings.

Qantas Loyalty earns revenue by selling points to Qantas's own airlines and to partners such as credit card issuers and retailers, which award them to their customers. Because partners pay for points well before they are redeemed, the program also provides Qantas with a working capital benefit. The ACCC reported that the program held A$3.3 billion of unredeemed points revenue in 2023–24 and that members redeemed 0.85 points for every point earned, a ratio that has generally been below one. In 2025 Glance said that about two-thirds of points were earned outside flying. Qantas says that cards earning Qantas Points account for more than 35 per cent of consumer credit card spending in Australia. In 2020 the Australian Competition and Consumer Commission (ACCC) described Qantas Frequent Flyer as the biggest loyalty scheme in Australia by membership.

Qantas Loyalty reported record earnings before interest and tax (EBIT) of A$231 million in 2011–12 and A$346 million in 2015–16. In 2024–25 it accounted for about 12 per cent of the Qantas Group's revenue but 23 per cent of its earnings, with underlying EBIT of A$556 million. In 2025–26 it reported revenue of A$2.9 billion and underlying EBIT of A$625 million; members earned 242 billion points and redeemed 202 billion. Qantas has set a target of A$800 million to A$1 billion in annual EBIT for the business by 2030.

=== Earning and redeeming points ===
Members earn Qantas Points for flights with Qantas, Jetstar and partner airlines, with the number of points set out in earning tables or calculated from the distance flown. Since 2014, the fare type has also affected the points earned on Qantas flights. Points can also be earned through more than 700 partners, including banks and other financial services providers, supermarkets, department stores, fuel retailers and insurers.

Points can be redeemed for flights and upgrades on Qantas, Jetstar and partner airlines, and for hotels, holidays, gift cards and goods. Classic Reward seats have fixed points prices but are limited in number; Qantas has said about five million are available each year on Qantas, Jetstar and partner airline flights. Classic Plus seats, which were initially available only on Qantas flights, are priced in line with cash fares and generally cost more points than Classic Reward seats but fewer than Points Plus Pay, which lets members pay for a fare with points or a mix of points and money and generally gives the lowest value per point of the flight redemption options. The ACCC has said that Classic Plus seats are more widely available than Classic Reward seats, and cited an estimate that a point redeemed for a Classic Reward seat was worth about 2 cents in August 2025. In 2025–26 members redeemed points for more than five million flight reward seats, including upgrades, more than a quarter of them through Classic Plus, and Qantas says about 70 per cent of points are redeemed on flight rewards within the Qantas Group.

=== Status tiers ===
Status credits, earned mainly from eligible flights, determine a member's tier for each membership year, and a member's lifetime total counts towards lifetime status. Higher tiers bring benefits such as priority check-in and boarding, larger baggage allowances and airport lounge access, and are recognised by other Oneworld airlines. As of September 2026, the tiers and their status credit requirements were as follows:

Qantas Frequent Flyer status tiers (September 2026)
Tier	Oneworld equivalent	Status credits to attain	Status credits to retain	Status credits for lifetime tier
Bronze	—	—	—	—
Silver	Ruby	300	250	7,000
Gold	Sapphire	700	600	14,000
Platinum	Emerald	1,400	1,200	75,000
Platinum One	Emerald	3,600	3,600	—

Silver, Gold and Platinum also require at least four eligible flights with a Qantas or Jetstar flight number, and at least 2,700 of the status credits for Platinum One must be earned on flights with a Qantas flight number. From 2027 the separate, lower retention thresholds will be replaced by a single annual target equal to the attainment level; for example, Gold members will need 700 status credits a year to keep their tier.

=== Chairman's Lounge ===
Separate from the status tiers, Qantas offers invitation-only membership of the Chairman's Lounge, which in 2023 had private lounges in the domestic terminals at Sydney, Melbourne, Brisbane, Adelaide, Canberra and Perth airports. The concept originated in the 1980s at Australian Airlines, before that airline's merger with Qantas. Membership cannot be bought or earned with points, and Qantas does not disclose its membership list or comment on why individuals are chosen. Invitations are extended to all federal politicians and to senior executives of Qantas's biggest corporate customers; in 2023 Qantas told a Senate inquiry that it had also invited the secretaries and deputy secretaries of federal departments, the chairs, chief executives and commissioners of government agencies, and senior military officials. Stephanie Tully, a former head of airline loyalty at Qantas, has described members as typically falling into three categories: "decision-makers, CEOs, and celebrities". In his 2026 memoir, Riding the Jet Stream, former chief executive Alan Joyce wrote that the core membership comprised federal politicians, most state politicians, High Court and federal judges, national newspaper editors, some journalists and prominent celebrities, and that companies spending about A$1 million a year on Qantas flights were likely to receive one membership, which could be shared among their executives. In his 2024 book The Chairman's Lounge, journalist Joe Aston estimated that there were about 5,000 primary members in 2023, or 9,000 including spouses. According to Qantas's website, members receive priority for customer service, airport check-in and security, baggage handling and upgrade requests.

== Criticism ==
=== Reward availability and value ===
Qantas has faced criticism regarding availability of seats for members redeeming points. In June 2004, the ACCC concluded an investigation into complaints that Qantas had not adequately disclosed restrictions on the availability of reward seats. The ACCC found insufficient evidence of a breach of the Trade Practices Act 1974, and Qantas said it had improved its disclosure, including by introducing an online search for reward seat availability. In late 2004, when Qantas increased the points needed for some international rewards and made upgrades harder to obtain, the Australian Consumers' Association (now Choice) said the changes contradicted the program's stated aim of rewarding loyal passengers; the same changes reduced the points needed for some domestic rewards. The Any Seat rewards introduced in 2008 allowed members to redeem points for any available seat, but at much higher prices: a one-way economy seat from Sydney to London required at least 235,933 points, compared with a minimum of 64,000 points for a Classic Reward seat.

After the COVID-19 pandemic, as demand for travel rebounded, many members, including some with high status, found few reward seats on which to use the large points balances they had accumulated, and complaints rose sharply. Members also complained that Points Plus Pay could require more than a million points for a single flight. The Australian Financial Review later wrote that Qantas had introduced Classic Plus in response to such criticism. More than 100 individuals made submissions about the program to a 2023 Senate select committee inquiry into bilateral air service agreements. A common grievance was that points were not as valuable as they had been in the past; one submitter attributed the diminishing value of their points to "increased redemption rates, limited availability of reward flights, and additional fees and charges". Qantas responded that its members had earned 175 billion points and redeemed 155 billion in the year to 30 June 2023, and said it would like to engage directly with the members who had raised concerns. The committee recommended consumer protection reforms to address problems including the "devaluation of loyalty programs".

The Guardian described the Classic Reward price increases that took effect on 5 August 2025 as effectively lowering the value of Qantas points, and The Australian Financial Review reported that they had diluted the value of points by as much as a fifth. According to the ACCC, the starting price of a Classic Reward fare on Qantas flights rose by 15 per cent, from 8,000 to 9,200 points, some premium economy, business and first-class Classic Reward fares rose by 20 per cent, and the points needed for short-haul Jetstar flights fell from 6,400 to 5,700. Loyalty program commentators estimated the average increase at 15 to 20 per cent; one said this amounted to about 2 to 3 per cent a year since the previous increase in 2019, roughly in line with inflation. Among examples given by Qantas, a one-way business-class Classic Reward seat from Sydney to London rose from 144,600 to 166,300 points, and the associated fees from A$473 to A$648. Qantas said the changes would allow it to keep increasing the number of seats available for points, and released 400,000 additional Classic Reward seats when they took effect.

In 2025 Qantas also cut the value of points used for Classic Plus seats in premium economy and business class from 1.5 to 1.25 cents per point. In January 2026 it announced increases in the points needed for reward seats in the premium cabins of partner airline Emirates, and said that Bronze members could no longer book Emirates first-class reward seats and that children under nine could no longer travel in Emirates first class on points, the last change taking effect immediately; Emirates had imposed similar restrictions on members of its own program in 2025. In a 2025 ranking of airline loyalty programs by the US-based points search service point.me, Qantas Frequent Flyer placed 17th; the service's co-founder said Classic Reward seats often offered the best redemption value but were scarce, while noting that improvements in Qantas's customer service had lifted its standing. Glance said record reward bookings showed that members were getting value from the program, and Qantas has said Classic Plus has made millions more reward seats available.

=== Consumer protection and data security ===
In 2013 consumer group Choice gave the Qantas Frequent Flyer Toolbar, a web browser toolbar that awarded points for internet searches, one of its Shonky Awards, criticising its monitoring of users' online activity, which it said offered very little in return. The ACCC's 2019 review of customer loyalty schemes found that frequent flyer schemes "have the potential to result in significant customer lock-in effects" and that Qantas Frequent Flyer "might have a significant impact on barriers to entry and expansion for the domestic business traveller segment", although it noted that Virgin Australia had been successful in growing its Velocity scheme. The review recommended that loyalty schemes give members prominent notice before points expire and advance notice of changes that devalue points, and raised concerns about consumers' limited insight into and control over how their data was collected and shared; Qantas said it did not sell members' personal data to third parties. In 2020 the ACCC authorised a five-year arrangement for Qantas, BP's Australian business and independent BP service stations to take part jointly in the companies' loyalty programs, although it was concerned that sharing consumer data between them could harm consumers, for example through reduced privacy.

In a 2025 report on domestic airline competition, the ACCC said loyalty schemes had the potential to reduce competition if they made it difficult for other airlines to attract customers, but noted that its March 2021 airline competition report had found that frequent flyer programs did not appear to have created a significant barrier to entry. The report also said that airlines could unilaterally reduce the value of their points, that members routinely expressed dissatisfaction when they did so, and that consumers might spend more than they otherwise would in pursuit of points and status credits. It said airlines should give clear and timely advance notice of such changes and a genuine opportunity to use points at the existing rates beforehand; Qantas undertakes to give at least three months' notice of changes within its control and to warn members 60 days before points expire.

Members' data has been affected by several incidents. In May 2024 a fault in the Qantas app let some users see other passengers' boarding passes and frequent flyer details; Qantas attributed it to a technology issue and said there was no indication of a cyber-security incident. In October 2024 about 800 customers were affected when two third-party airport contractors in India allegedly made unauthorised changes to bookings in an attempt to redirect points to an account they controlled; Qantas said the customers had received the points and status credits they were entitled to. In July 2025 Qantas disclosed that a cybercriminal had targeted a call centre used by the airline and gained access to a third-party system holding customer data. It later said the records of 5.7 million customers were held on the system, about 2.8 million of which included frequent flyer numbers; some also included members' tiers, points balances and status credits. Qantas said no frequent flyer accounts had been compromised and that the system did not hold credit card, financial or passport details. In October 2025 the hackers said they had released the data on the dark web after a ransom deadline passed. Qantas cut the short-term bonuses of its chief executive and senior executives for 2024–25 by 15 per cent because of the breach. In July 2026 the Office of the Australian Information Commissioner published the Privacy Commissioner's decision to end preliminary inquiries without opening an investigation or taking other regulatory action; the commissioner found that the evidence did not point to significant omissions or failures in the steps Qantas had taken to address security risks.

=== Government travel and the Chairman's Lounge ===
Government travel arrangements have also drawn scrutiny. Since 2010 federal politicians and public servants have been unable to earn frequent flyer points on official travel, but they can still earn status credits. Virgin Australia has argued that status credits encourage public servants to choose Qantas despite the government's "lowest practical fare" policy, and has called for them to be removed from official bookings; Qantas has said that frequent flyer benefits such as lounge access and extra baggage allowances reduce travel costs and help officials be more productive. A Department of Finance review of government travel, released in 2025, noted concerns raised by the public, parliamentarians and submitters that access to exclusive lounges provided by Qantas and Virgin might unduly influence government travel patterns. It found higher use of Qantas by public servants travelling to and from Canberra, but attributed this to Qantas offering more flights and said the booking patterns were consistent with those of the public; it did not recommend restricting lounge memberships. In January 2026 the department decided that officials could continue to earn status credits, but its guidelines for an upcoming tender required airlines to block public servants' access to double status credit promotions. Public servants were already barred from such promotions, but The Canberra Times had reported that the rule was not being enforced and that bookings rose by 20 per cent during them. In May 2026 the government banned agencies from charging taxpayers for public servants' airline lounge memberships, although senior public servants could still accept complimentary Chairman's Lounge memberships.

According to The Australian Financial Review, there have been long-held concerns that Qantas uses Chairman's Lounge membership to influence commercial outcomes. In 2023 it was reported that five of the ACCC's seven commissioners, including its chair, and the chair of the Australian Securities and Investments Commission were members. Later that year the Australian Public Service Commission updated its guidance to require agency heads to record gifted airline lounge memberships, including invitation-only ones, in their agencies' gifts and benefits registers. In his book, published in October 2024, Aston described the Chairman's Lounge as "a speakeasy for Australia's ruling class" and argued that it led companies, politicians and public servants to favour Qantas. Amid controversy over complimentary flight upgrades for politicians that followed the book's publication, several federal MPs, including independents Allegra Spender, Helen Haines and Kate Chaney, gave up their Chairman's Lounge memberships, while others defended lounge access as useful for their work. Spender said that "special treatment of politicians by Qantas and Virgin has undermined public trust in government and effective competition in the aviation industry". In November 2024 the ACCC's chair, Gina Cass-Gottlieb, and other senior ACCC officials resigned from the lounge, citing "increasing community concerns and changing perception of this membership" in light of the regulator's role in the airline and airport sectors. About 90 per cent of federal parliamentarians were still members in 2025. In his memoir, Joyce rejected claims that Qantas had exercised influence through lounge membership, calling them "the wildest assertion".

== See also ==
- List of frequent flyer programs
- Velocity Frequent Flyer
