= Foodtown Supermarkets Ltd v Commerce Commission =

- Court: High Court of New Zealand
- Full case name: Foodtown Supermarkets Ltd v Commerce Commission
- Decided: 14 June 1990
- Citation: [1991] 1 NZLR 466

Court membership
- Judge sitting: Jefferies J

Foodtown Supermarkets Ltd v Commerce Commission [1991] 1 NZLR 466 is a cited case in New Zealand regarding the concept of invitation to treat, can be now considered as legally binding offers under the Fair Trading Act 1986.

== Background ==
An investigation by the Commerce Commission revealed numerous instances where Foodtown Supermarkets had products on its shelves that were different when they were rung up at checkout, although in most cases, the prices were changed at checkout when they were notified of these anomalies.

As a result, the Commerce Commission filed criminal charges under section 13(g) of the Fair Trading Act.

Foodtown defended the charges by claiming that under the law a price on a shelf is merely an invitation to treat, and not a formal offer of sale, which the retailer in Fisher v Bell [1961] 1 QB 394 successfully pleaded in court.

Foodtown was convicted, and they appealed.

== Held ==
The court upheld the conviction.
