= Progressive Enterprises =

New Zealand retail conglomerate

Progressive Enterprises was a New Zealand retail conglomerate, founded in 1949 by the Picot family. It was acquired by Woolworths Group in 2005.

== History ==
Progressive Enterprises Limited was established on 9 February 1949 by the Picot family.

In 1961, Progressive Enterprises became the parent company to Foodtown. In 1974, Albert Gubay opened the first 3Guys store. Progressive Enterprises purchased the chain in 1987, and rebranded or closed them throughout the 1990s with the store in Hillcrest, Hamilton being one of the last when it closed in January 1998. In 1988, Progressive Enterprises became part of Australian business Coles Myer. In 1992, Coles Myer relaunched Progressive Enterprises onto the New Zealand stock exchange as its own public company.

In May 2001, the company, at this point the owner of Foodtown, Countdown, SuperValue and FreshChoice, made a bid to purchase Woolworths (New Zealand). The merger application was cleared by the Commerce Commission but then withdrawn following court action by rival Foodstuffs. Progressive made another application for the merger in October 2001. The Commerce Commission declined the application in December 2001. Australia's Woolworths Group also expressed interest in acquiring the company. In 2005, Woolworths Group acquired Progressive Enterprises.
