= Frill =

Frill may refer to:

- Frill (fashion), a form of trimming
- Neck frill, the relatively extensive margin seen on the back of the heads of some reptiles
- Frill, the reverse feathering on the chests of varieties of fancy pigeon
- John Frill (1879-1918), Major League Baseball pitcher

== See also ==
- No-frills (disambiguation)
