= Sean Senvirtne =

Australian businessman

Sean Senvirtne is an Australian businessman. He is the founder of the online marketplace MyDeal, which later became a subsidiary of Woolworths Group. In 2022, he sold the majority share of the MyDeal group to Woolworths in a deal worth $280 million. He retained shares in the business, and remained as the chief executive of MyDeal until its closure in late 2025.

As a businessman, he has been recognised by Australian media for his entrepreneurship.

== Career ==
In his twenties, Senvirtne founded two startups. The second of which was NiteGuide, which ran as a Whitepages specifically for nightclubs in Australia. To make the website profitable, Senvirtne between 2007 and 2011 pitched advertising packages for the website, which gave him the idea for MyDeal.

In 2011, Sean Senvirtne founded MyDeal, an online marketplace in Australia for independent sellers to sell goods, often furniture and homeware. By 2015, Deloitte listed E-com, the parent of MyDeal, as the ninth fastest growing tech company in Australia. Senvirtne was recognised for the growth of MyDeal by CEO Magazine, when he was put forward for its CEO of the Year award.

By 2019, Australian Financial Review reported that MyDeal had reached $60 million AUD Gross Turnover Value (GTV) run rate, and would consider an initial public offering. Around the same time, Senvirtne announced that MyDeal would begin to offer a range of products via its own private label. In October 2020, it was announced that MyDeal would be floated on the Australian Stock Exchange (ASX). It valued MyDeal at A$259 million. After it listed on the ASX, MyDeal initially increased its share value by around 80%.

In May 2022, Woolworths made an offer to acquire up to 80% of MyDeal.com.au from Senvirtne. The deal was touted my Australian media to create an online platform for Woolworths that could rival Amazon in the country, in a deal worth $243 million. As part of the deal, Senvirtne would retain a 20% stake. As the Woolworths acquisition of MyDeal was finalised, it was announced that Big W would expand its online reach by listing its products on MyDeal. Following the deal, Senvirtne remained as chief executive of MyDeal. In August 2022, he frequently appeared in the media following a data breach. MyDeal was shut down by Woolworths in late 2025.
