= Dress Smart =

New Zealand shopping centre franchise

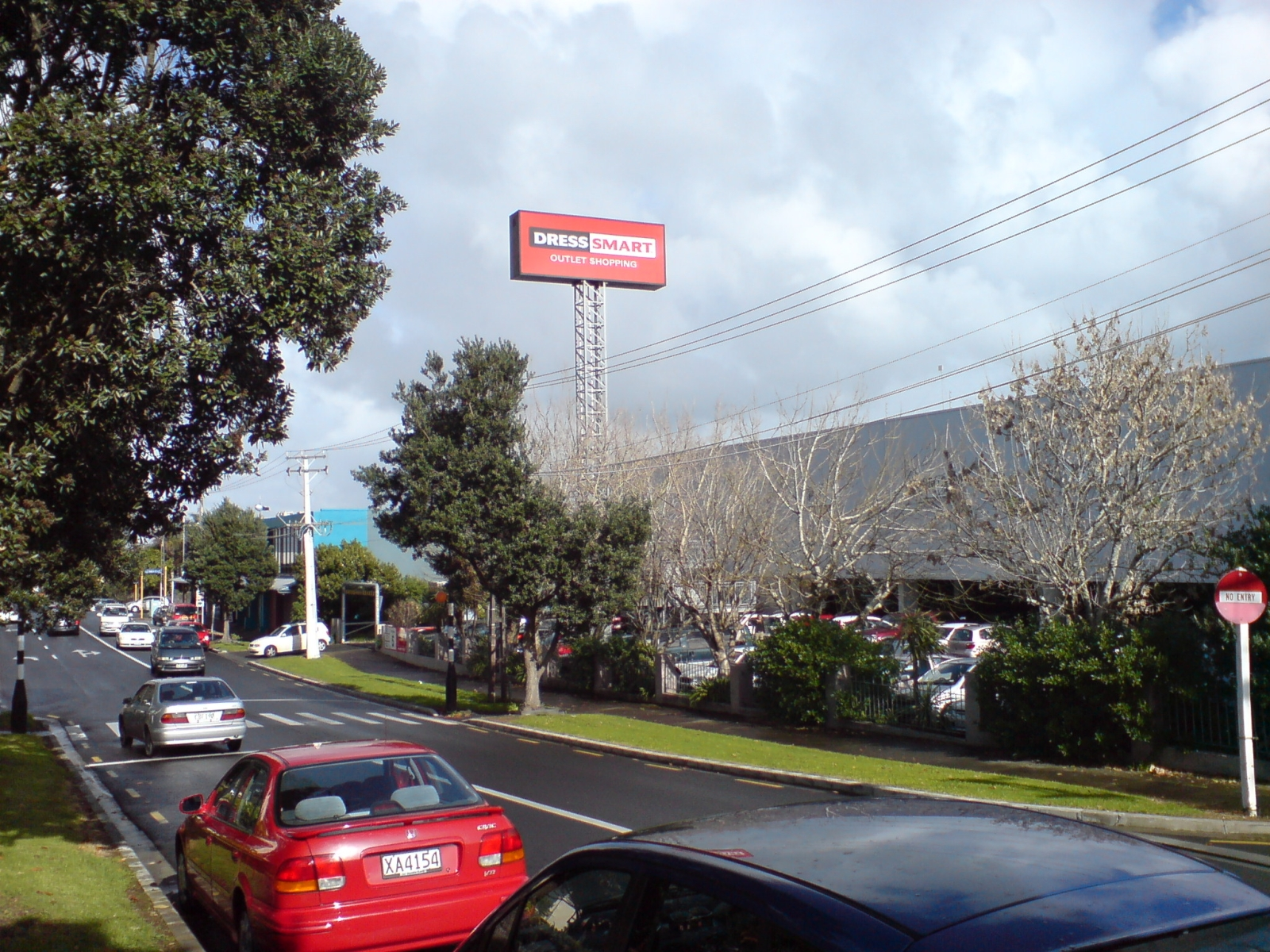
- Dress Smart as viewed from Galway Street, Onehunga.
- Location: Onehunga, Auckland; Hornby, Christchurch
- Address: 151 Arthur Street, Onehunga, Auckland 1061, New Zealand; 409 Main South Road, Hornby, Christchurch
- Opened: 1995; 31 years ago
- Developer: Argyle Estates
- Owner: Lendlease
- Num. of stores: 100+ (Auckland); 45+ (Christchurch)
- Floors: 2
- Website: dress-smart.co.nz

Dress Smart is a franchise of shopping centres in New Zealand that specialises in outlet stores.

== History ==
Dress Smart opened in October 1995 as New Zealand's first factory outlet shopping centre. The company was created by John Bougen, was inspired by a factory outlet centre between Vancouver and Seattle.

The first centre was located in Onehunga, Auckland. On a site that was once the premises of a 3 Guys supermarket and some neighbouring stores. Twenty stores were at the centre on opening day including Just Jeans, Michael Hill, and Rodd & Gunn that still operate stores at the centre and the since closed The Body Shop, Lane Walker Rudkin (now Canterbury), Country Road, Esprit, Nautica, Overland, Pumpkin Patch. Due to the centres popularity retailiers opened in the nearby Paynes Lane until expansion led to its demolition and move underground in 1999.

Dress Smart opened a Christchurch (Hornby) shopping centre in 1998. Also in 1998 AMP Asset Management acquired half of Dress Smart.

In 1999, Dress Smart was granted resource consent to double the size of its Onehunga shopping centre. Dress Smart opened in Wellington (Tawa) in October 2000.

In 2003 the three centres were sold to ING Retail Property Fund Australia.

A Hamilton shopping centre opened in March 2006 as part of The Base.

Dress Smart completed an expansion of its Onehunga and Hornby centres in 2005, the Onehunga store count was brought to 110.

Dress Smart was sold in 2010 to the Lendlease.

The Wellington shopping centre was sold in 2013 and rebranded to Outlet Centre.

Dress Smart Hornby was listed for sale in 2025.

== Centres ==
Name	Size	Opened	Closed
Auckland / Onehunga	13,202 m^{2} (142,105 sq ft)	22 October 1995	open
Christchurch / Hornby	7,125 m^{2} (76,693 sq ft)	1998	open
Wellington / Tawa		October 1999	2013 (sold and rebranded to Outlet Centre)
Hamilton / Te Rapa		1st March 2006	(now The Base)

== See also ==
- List of shopping centres in New Zealand
