= FreshChoice =

New Zealand supermarket chain franchise owned by Woolworths Group

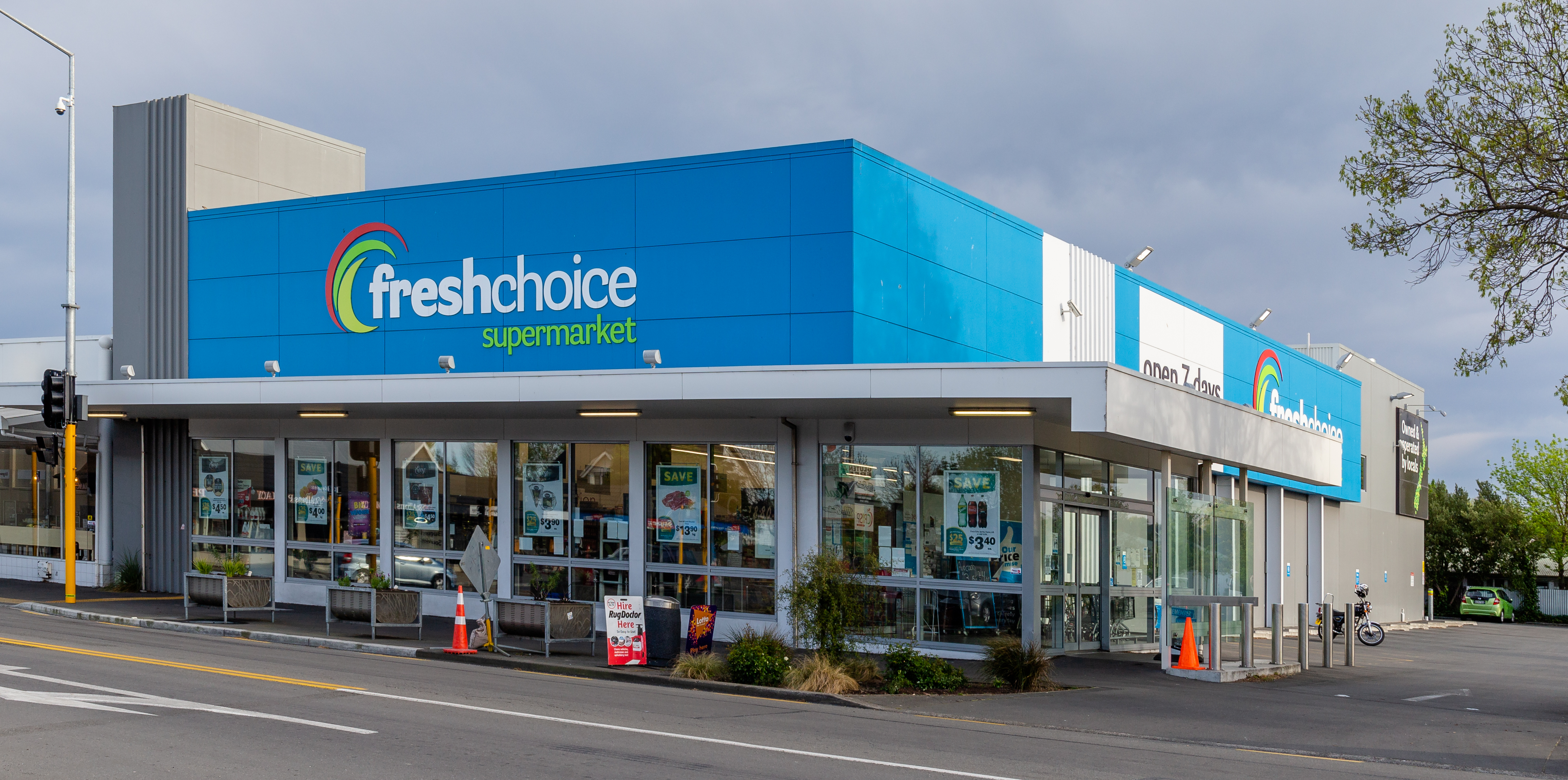
- FreshChoice in Edgeware, Christchurch, New Zealand
- Type: Subsidiary
- Industry: Retail
- Founded: 1995; 31 years ago
- Headquarters: Christchurch, New Zealand
- Number of locations: 74 stores (August 2025)
- Parent: Woolworths (New Zealand)
- Website: www.freshchoice.co.nz

FreshChoice is a franchise of locally owned and operated supermarkets across New Zealand. It is owned by Woolworths (New Zealand), the New Zealand division of the Australian Woolworths

== History ==
The franchise was established in 1995.

By 2008, it had 15 stores but was yet to expand into Auckland.

In 2023, Woolworths (New Zealand) began the process of rebranding all of its SuperValue stores as FreshChoice, this was part of a plan to expand the FreshChoice chain to 200 stores by 2034.

In October 2025, FreshChoice joined the Everyday Rewards program.

== Operations ==
There are 74 FreshChoice stores across New Zealand, including 11 in Auckland. The stores are operated under franchise agreements with Wholesale Distributors Ltd (WDL), a division of Woolworths, one of New Zealand's largest retail and distribution companies.
