= MyDeal =

Australian e-commerce platform

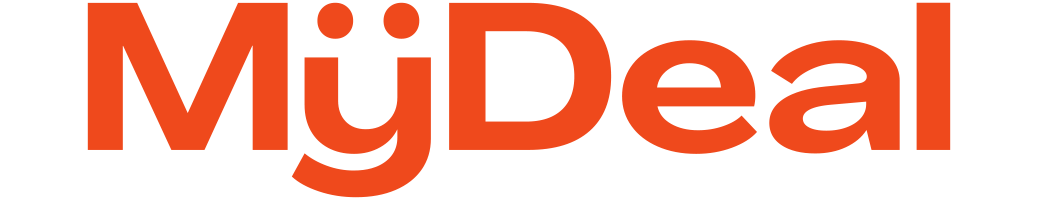
- Type: Division
- Industry: Online retail, Marketplace
- Founded: 2011; 15 years ago in Melbourne, Victoria, Australia
- Founder: Sean Senvirtne
- Defunct: 2025; 1 year ago
- Headquarters: Melbourne, Victoria, Australia
- Key people: CEO: Sean Senvirtne; Chief Marketing Officer: Ryan Gracie; CTO: Matthew Hosking; COO: Joshua Mangan
- Products: Homewares, furniture, electronics, fashion
- Owner: Woolworths Group
- Website: www.mydeal.com.au

MyDeal was an e-commerce platform operating as an online marketplace. It was launched in 2011 and acquired by Woolworths Group in 2022 before being shut down in 2025.

== History ==
Sean Senvirtne, an Australian entrepreneur, founded MyDeal and also served as its CEO. Between 2007 and 2011, while working on advertising packages, Senvirtne conceptualized the idea for MyDeal, leading to its establishment.

In 2021, MyDeal expanded its executive team by appointing Ryan Gracie as its first Chief Marketing Officer (CMO). Prior to joining MyDeal, Gracie was part of Catch.com.au. This appointment preceded MyDeal's comprehensive rebranding initiative.

In September 2022, it was acquired by Woolworths Group, a major retail company in Australia.

In October 2022, MyDeal experienced a significant data breach, where personal information of approximately 2.2 million customers was exposed. The breach included names, email addresses, and phone numbers. Woolworths Group promptly responded, apologizing for the incident and taking immediate steps to secure the compromised data and prevent future breaches.

In June 2025, Woolworths Group announced that they would close down MyDeal by 30 September 2025 due to a lack of profitability and intense competition. MyDeal's platform was incorporated into Woolworths Group's other marketplace platforms including Everyday Market and Big W Market.
