= Total Fitness =

British health club chain

Total Fitness is a chain of health clubs in the UK that has been operated by Total Fitness Health Clubs Limited since 1993.

== History ==
Total Fitness opened in 1993 after being established by Kwik Save founder Albert Gubay on the Isle of Man. It was sold to the private equity arm of Legal & General in December 2004 for £80 million (€120 million). In 2015, Total Fitness was bought by North Edge Capital. Sophie Lawler joined Total Fitness in June 2018 as CEO.

== Description ==
Total Fitness claims to be a mid-market health club brand in the North. It has 15 health clubs across the North of England and Wales. It claims a staff of 600 people and 80,000 members.

Total Fitness' head office is based in Wilmslow, within the Wilmslow Club.
