= Big Fresh =

Defunct New Zealand supermarket chain

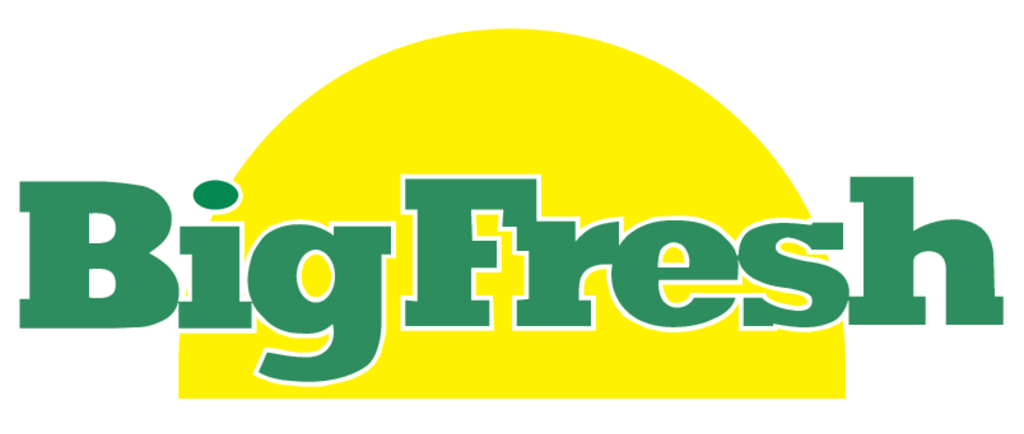
- Logo used from 1988 to 2003
- Type: Subsidiary
- Industry: Retail
- Founded: 1988; 38 years ago
- Defunct: 2003; 23 years ago
- Fate: Rebranded to Countdown or Woolworths
- Number of locations: 11 stores (2002)
- Area served: New Zealand
- Products: Discount supermarket
- Parent: Woolworths

Big Fresh was a New Zealand supermarket chain. The first Big Fresh store opened in 1988 in Mount Wellington, Auckland. In 2003, the Big Fresh brand was shut-down by its owner Progressive Enterprises, with branches converted to Countdown or Woolworths, or shut down altogether.

The distinguishing feature of the Big Fresh was its emulation of a farmers market in a supermarket environment, with a focus on an extensive range of fresh foods; this was unique in New Zealand at the time of its opening.

In addition to its market-like atmosphere, Big Fresh had a number of features that made their stores unique within New Zealand, such as a Popcorn Club for children and in-store family entertainment, such as animatronic singing and dancing fruits and vegetables, mooing cows, singing sausages, and giant egg-laying chickens.

== History ==
The first Big Fresh store opened in 1988 in Mount Wellington, Auckland. The entertainment attracted customers, allowing Big Fresh to outpace Woolworths on average store turnover.

The Big Fresh concept became popular throughout New Zealand and the chain expanded throughout the country. Through its links to Woolworths and Dairy Farm International, who also owned the Franklins supermarket chain in Australia, the Big Fresh brand was launched in Australia under the brand Franklins Big Fresh. For a brief period the Big Fresh brand in New Zealand was changed to Franklins at Big Fresh, using the slogan "More in your trolley for less."

In 1999, Big Fresh had six stores.

In 2002, there were 11 Big Fresh stores around the North Island.

In July 2003, the Big Fresh brand was shut-down, with all branches converted to Countdown or Woolworths, or shut down altogether.

== Generic products ==
Owing to its links with Woolworths and later Progressive Enterprises, Big Fresh stocked the No Frills and First Choice generic product brands. Both brands were dropped by Progressive Enterprises when Dairy Farm International exited the partnership in 2002.
