= Price Chopper (New Zealand) =

Defunct supermarket chain

- Logo used from 1987 to 2004
- Type: Subsidiary
- Industry: Retail
- Founded: 1987; 39 years ago
- Defunct: 2004; 22 years ago
- Fate: Rebranded to Countdown or Woolworths
- Number of locations: 17 stores (2003)
- Area served: New Zealand
- Products: Discount supermarket
- Parent: Woolworths

Price Chopper was part of the Woolworths Group, alongside Woolworths and Big Fresh.

== History ==
The Price Chopper format was established in 1987, as a discount supermarket chain with a limited fresh foods. Woolworths rebranded its smaller stores under the new brand, allowing them to remain open and ensure the sites were not taken over by competitors.

Price Chopper stores were centrally located in small towns and metro areas with no discount supermarkets, and the stores had the same modern technology of larger supermarket chains.

There were 14 Price Chopper stores in 2001.

There were 17 Price Chopper stores in 2003. There were no stores in Auckland.

On 12 April 2004, the Price Chopper brand ceased to operate within New Zealand. Many of the stores were converted to Countdown or Woolworths stores.

== Generic products ==
The Price Chopper Chain had a high focus on the Woolworths corporate brands, No Frills and First Choice

=== No Frills ===
No Frills was originally used with Franklins Australia as their generic range of products, with their ties to Dairy Farm International Holdings the No Frills product was launched in Woolworths and had a huge success with the Price Chopper and Big Fresh brands

Originally, the No Frills brand was only used for its peanut butter, honey and potato chips but expanded its range to more than 800 products in packaged groceries and perishables.

=== First Choice ===
First Choice was another generic range of products Woolworths had sold. Launched in 1998, it was developed to provide an alternative to the leading brands and have products with quality equal to or better than the leading brands. The products didn't just have the quality but also had prices that were anywhere between 10 and 15% cheaper than the national brands.

First Choice had over 600 different products and new products were continually being developed every day. The brand did not survive for long though and by the time Dairy Farm International Holdings exited the company in 2002 when it was bought by Woolworths.
