= H Williams (supermarket) =

Irish retail company

H Williams was a supermarket chain in Ireland which originated as a grocer/tea importer that became a registered company in March 1894 with a listing on the Dublin Stock Exchange.

H Williams' head office was situated in Dundrum, Dublin.

H Williams' other Dublin supermarkets included ones located in Rathmines, Sandymount, Terenure, Tallaght (now a Lidl) and Killester. Outside Dublin, it had a supermarket in Mullingar (the present-day Fairgreen Shopping Centre is located on its former site) and one in Tullamore (which was purchased, and is still operated, by Dunnes Stores).

== History ==
In 1959, it opened the first supermarket in Ireland, in Dublin's Henry Street. Although publicly listed on the Dublin Stock Exchange for many years, the Quinn-McArdle family controlled its board and provided most of its senior management. In the early 1980s, it was sold to its managing director, John Quinn, and property developer Finbarr Holland. In 1986 Tesco sold their Irish operation to H Williams for £17 million.

H Williams collapsed in 1987, following a price war that led to the 1987 amendment to the Groceries Order in an effort to protect the market from further concentration. The former H Williams supermarkets were sold to other supermarket chains.
