= SuperValue =

New Zealand supermarket chain owned by Woolworths Group

- SuperValue Logo

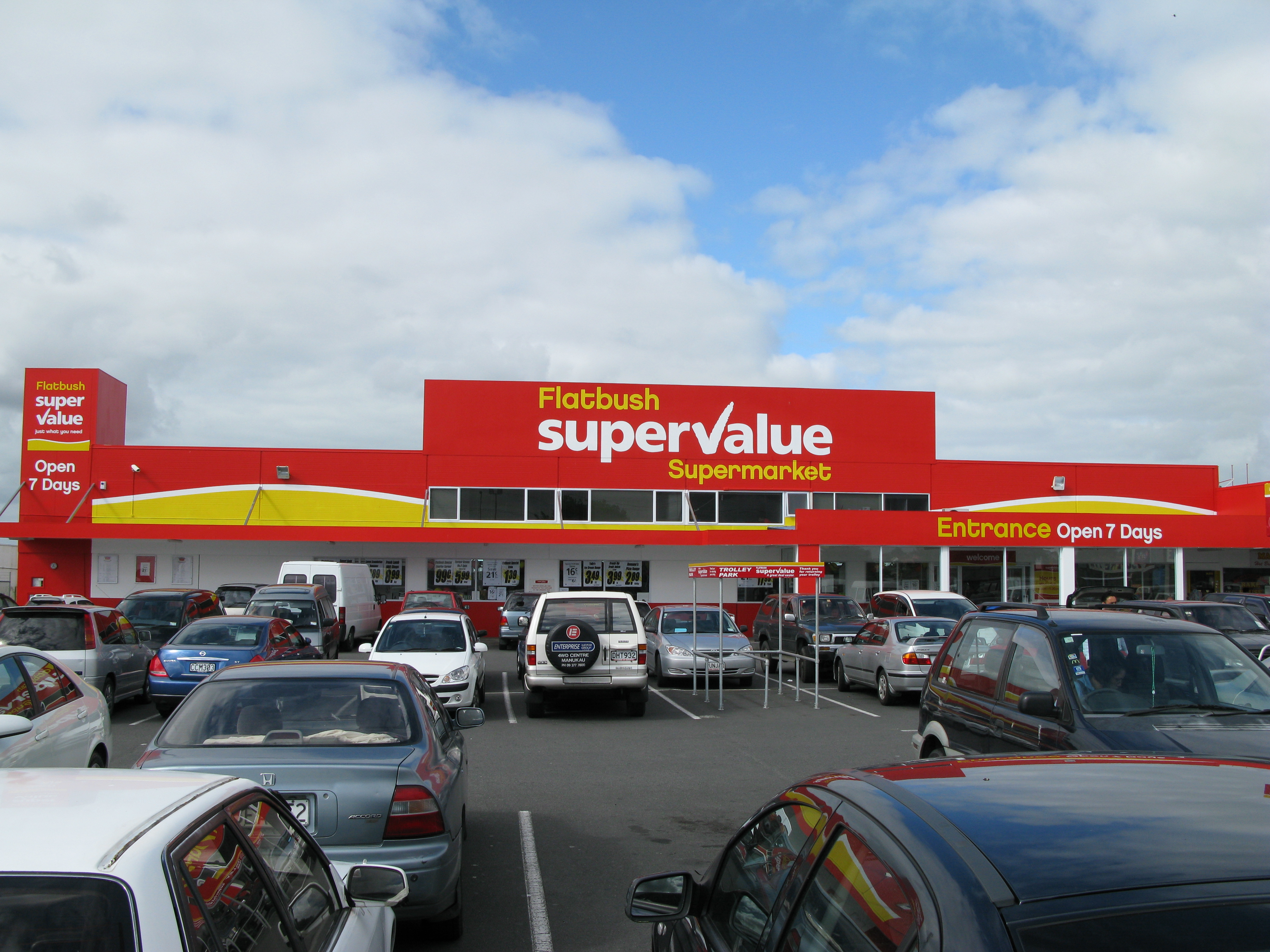
- SuperValue outlet in Flat Bush
- Type: Division
- Industry: Retail
- Founded: 1964; 62 years ago
- Headquarters: New Zealand
- Number of locations: 2 stores (November 2026): Mangawhai; Milton
- Key people: See Parent
- Owner: Woolworths (New Zealand)
- Parent: Woolworths Group
- Subsidiaries: SuperValue Community
- Website: www.supervalue.co.nz

SuperValue is a chain of locally owned and operated supermarkets in New Zealand, established in 1964. The stores are operated under franchise agreements, with franchise and group operation controlled by Wholesale Distributors Limited (WDL). The franchise is owned and operated by Woolworths (New Zealand)

== History ==
G.U.S. (Grocers United Stores) was launched as a grocery store co-operative in 1928, and quickly opened 15 stores. Store numbers reached 167 in 1948.

The Opawa, Christchurch store became the first store under the SuperValue brand in 1964. SuperValue started out as SuperValu, with no ‘e’, but following an uproar from customers about the spelling that it was quickly changed.

The 1964 opening of the first SuperValue store was a turning point when New Zealand started adopting the supermarket concept from overseas. At the time this was different for New Zealand consumers, whose usual style was picking weekly groceries from many outlets.

SuperValue Supermarkets was purchased by JR Rattray in 1991. Countdown, SuperValue and Rattray were purchased by Foodland (FAL) in 1993. The brands became subsidiaries of Progressive Enterprises in 1995.

In 2005, Woolworths, one of the major supermarket chain of Australia, partnered with Metcash, the supplier of the Australian IGA as well as other independent supermarket brands, acquired Foodland. Woolworths acquired all Foodland's New Zealand stores, while Metcash acquired some of the Foodland's business in Australia.

In 2008, SuperValue had several stores in New Zealand, including stores in Auckland and Christchurch and other cities.

In 2023, Woolworths New Zealand began the process of rebranding all SuperValue stores to FreshChoice. Between 2024 and 2025, several SuperValue stores throughout New Zealand were rebranded as FreshChoice stores. As of November 2026, there are only two SuperValue stores remaining in Mangawhai and Milton.
