= List of shopping centres in New Zealand =

The following is a list of notable shopping centres in New Zealand.

For comparison, the largest mall in Canada, the West Edmonton Mall in Edmonton, Alberta, Canada has a retail space of 350,000 m^{2}. The largest in the United States of America is the 230,000 m^{2} Mall of America in Bloomington, Minnesota. Melbourne's Chadstone Shopping Centre, which has been described as the largest shopping centre in the Southern Hemisphere, has 233,664 m^{2} of retail space.

Name	Coordinates	Location	Territorial authority area	Region	Opened	Upgraded	Space	Tenants	Parking spaces	Anchor tenants
Albany Mega Centre	36.7310698°S 174.7035199°E	Albany	Upper Harbour	Auckland	Pre-2003	Unknown	33,792 m^{2}	25	1300	Farmers, The Warehouse, Briscoes, Chemist Warehouse
Atrium on Elliott	36.8499043°S 174.7615233°E	Auckland CBD	Waitematā	Auckland	1990	Unknown	14,000 m^{2}	23	736	The Warehouse, Rebel Sport, Elliott Stables
Avonhead Mall	43.5110521°S 172.5554008°E	Avonhead	Christchurch	Canterbury	1966	1995, 1980s	3,876 m^{2}	12	166	Woolworths
Barrington	43.556246°S 172.6180115°E	Barrington	Christchurch	Canterbury	1973	2011	14,959 m^{2}	50	600	FreshChoice, The Warehouse
The Base	36.8488251°S 174.7157283°E	Te Rapa	Hamilton	Waikato	2005	Unknown	85,681 m^{2}	158	3,343	The Warehouse, Mitre 10 Mega, Farmers, Hoyts Cinemas
Bay Central Shopping Centre	37.6738889°S 176.1630891°E	Tauranga Central	Tauranga	Bay of Plenty	1977	Unknown	17,000 m^{2}	29	300	Briscoes, Rebel Sport, Freedom Furniture, Hunting and Fishing
Bay Plaza	39.640547°S 176.846119°E	Hastings Central	Hastings	Hawke's Bay	2013	None	150	8	Unknown	Kmart, Bed Bath & Beyond
Bayfair	37.6750439°S 176.2205923°E	Mount Maunganui	Tauranga	Bay of Plenty	1985/1986	2019	41,445 m^{2}	142	1660	Farmers, Kmart, Woolworths, United Cinemas
Bethlehem Town Centre	37.6935729°S 176.1084711°E	Bethlehem	Tauranga	Bay of Plenty	2003	2016	20,000 m^{2}	50	1000	Kmart, Woolworths
Bishopdale Village Mall	43.4895187°S 172.5856541°E	Bishopdale	Christchurch	Canterbury	1965	Unknown	Unknown	80	600	New World
Botany Town Centre	36.9313348°S 174.9110482°E	East Tāmaki	Howick	Auckland	2001	2019	62,700 m^{2} (1 floor)	200	Unknown	Farmers, New World, Hoyts Cinemas, The Warehouse, Pak'nSave
The Boundary	36.8829473°S 174.6331372°E	Henderson	Henderson-Massey	Auckland	1980s	2005	18,027 m^{2}	26	800	Kmart, Briscoes, Rebel Sport
Bush Inn Centre	43.5309149°S 172.5731118°E	Upper Riccarton	Christchurch	Canterbury	1988	Unknown	Unknown	60	Unknown	Briscoes, Lincraft
Capital Gateway Centre	41.2765576°S 174.7794744°E	Pipitea	Wellington	Wellington	1980s	Unknown	Unknown	13	Unknown	Freedom Furniture, Early Settler
Centre City	39.0564893°S 174.0715434°E	New Plymouth Central	New Plymouth	Taranaki	1988	Unknown	14,530 m^{2}	125	700	Farmers
Centre Place	37.3145592°S 174.4636086°E	Hamilton Central	Hamilton	Waikato	1985	2013	15,805 m^{2}	77	554	Farmers, Rebel Sport, Hoyts Cinemas, Lido Cinema
Chartwell Shopping Centre	37.750353°S 175.2766276°E	Chartwell	Hamilton	Waikato	1974	2010	29,000 m^{2}	129	1093	Farmers, Woolworths, H&M, Event Cinemas
Coast	36.6362819°S 174.7458197°E	Whangaparāoa Peninsula	Hibiscus and Bays	Auckland	1970s	2016, 2003, Mid-1990s	19,623 m^{2}	37	350	Woolworths, The Warehouse, Club Physical
Coastlands Shopping Centre	40.9171603°S 175.0023868°E	Paraparaumu	Kāpiti Coast	Wellington	1969	2016	49,000 m^{2}	94	1800	Pak'nSave, The Warehouse, Farmers, Woolworths, Event Cinemas
The Colombo	43.5466596°S 172.6340835°E	Sydenham	Christchurch	Canterbury	1978	2012	7,933 m^{2}	44	Unknown	Smiths City, Academy Gold Cinema
Commercial Bay	36.8438644°S 174.7640177°E	Auckland CBD	Waitematā	Auckland	2019	2020	18,000 m^{2}	120	2020	H&M
The Crossing	37.7379036°S 176.1021862°E	Christchurch CBD	Christchurch	Canterbury	2017	Unknown	14,000 m^{2}	40	630	H&M, FreshChoice
Dress Smart Hornby	43.5436649°S 172.522496°E	Hornby	Christchurch	Canterbury	1999	2005	7,117 m^{2}	53	347	No anchor tenant
Dress Smart Onehunga	36.9220912°S 174.7841803°E	Onehunga	Maungakiekie-Tāmaki	Auckland	1995	2005	13,217 m^{2}	101	735	No anchor tenant
Eastgate Mall	43.5338973°S 172.67422°E	Linwood	Christchurch	Canterbury	1986	Mid-2000s, 1990s	30,500 m^{2}	40	1100	The Warehouse, Woolworths, Warehouse Stationery, Number One Shoes, Lincraft
Eastridge Shopping Centre	36.8606695°S 174.8272064°E	Mission Bay	Ōrākei	Auckland	1995	Unknown	7,100 m^{2}	32	427	New World,
Fashion Island	37.701577°S 176.281048°E	Papamoa	Tauranga	Bay of Plenty	2006	2016	3,315 m^{2}	20	300	No anchor tenant
Fraser Cove	37.7120003°S 176.149062°E	Tauranga South	Tauranga	Bay of Plenty	2002	Unknown	32,500 m^{2}	35	1235	The Warehouse, Woolworths
Gate Pa Shopping Centre	37.7317334°S 176.0928319°E	Gate Pa	Tauranga	Bay of Plenty	2006	2011	10,000 m^{2}	21	450	Mitre 10 Mega, Spotlight, New World
Glenfield Mall	36.7819322°S 174.7193936°E	Glenfield	Kaipātiki	Auckland	1971	2017, 2006, 1999, 1991, 1986	30,500 m^{2}	110	1553	Farmers, The Warehouse, Woolworths, Briscoes
Glenview Shopping Centre	37.8221941°S 175.2888487°E	Glenview	Hamilton	Waikato	1969	Unknown	Unknown	Unknown	Unknown	New World
Goldfields Shopping Centre	37.1388669°S 175.5372538°E	Thames	Thames Coromandel	Waikato	1990s	None	8,169 m^{2}	15	550	Pak'nSave, The Warehouse, Warehouse Stationery, Lincraft
Highbury Shopping Centre	36.810818°S 174.7227702°E	Birkenhead	Kaipātiki	Auckland	1995	Unknown	Unknown	25	600	Woolworths
Highfield Village Mall	44.3900593°S 171.2241704°E	Highfield	South Canterbury	Canterbury	1971	Unknown	Unknown	8	100	New World
The Hub Botany	43.5426578°S 172.5220779°E	Huntington Park	Howick	Auckland	2001	Unknown	200	Unknown	Unknown	Woolworths, Harvey Norman
The Hub Hornby	36.930240°S 174.909299°E	Hornby	Christchurch	Canterbury	1976	2016	24,000 m^{2}	80	750	Pak'nSave, Farmers
The Hub Whakatane	37.953709°S 176.966351°E	Whakatane	Whakatane	Bay of Plenty	2006	Unknown	24,000 m^{2}	15	900	Farmers, Kmart, Briscoes, Harvey Norman, Bunnings
Hunters Plaza	36.9708754°S 174.8582561°E	Papatoetoe	Ōtara-Papatoetoe	Auckland	1991	2015	Unknown	47	700	Kmart, Woolworths
Invercargill Central Mall	46.412230°S 168.348522°E	Invercargill Central	Invercargill	Southland	2022	None	Unknown	38	675	Farmers
Johnsonville Shopping Centre	41.2239295°S 174.8037686°E	Johnsonville	Wellington	Wellington	1969	1993, Pre-1990	10,000 m^{2}	70	500	Woolworths
Kelston Mall	36.9048276°S 174.6597967°E	Glen Eden	Waitākere Ranges	Auckland	1977	2019, 1997	7,741 m^{2}	25	250	Woolworths
Levin Mall	40.6222939°S 175.2820041°E	Levin	Horowhenua	Manawatū-Whanganui	1971	Unknown	791 m^{2}	14	300	Farmers, Warehouse Stationery
LynnMall	36.9075879°S 174.6836401°E	New Lynn	Whau	Auckland	1963	2015	37,689 m^{2} (2 floors)	139	1,319	Farmers, Woolworths, JB HiFi, Reading Cinemas
The Mall Upper Hutt	41.1235546°S 175.0706777°E	Upper Hutt Central	Upper Hutt	Wellington	1970s	2007	17,000 m^{2}	44	300	The Warehouse, Farmers, Monterey Cinemas
Manukau Supa Centa	36.9913525°S 174.8681393°E	Manukau Central	Ōtara-Papatoetoe	Auckland	1998	None	37,010 m^{2}	41	400	Kmart, Harvey Norman
Meadowbank Shopping Centre	36.8763129°S 174.8257221°E	Meadowbank	Ōrākei	Auckland	1993	2011	5,215 m^{2}	30	303	Woolworths
Meridian Mall / Golden Centre Mall / Wall Street Mall	45.8702316°S 170.5023006°E	Dunedin Central	Dunedin	Otago	1997	2009	16,000 m^{2}	65	650	JB Hi-Fi
Merivale Mall	36.9088176°S 174.8351973°E	Merivale	Christchurch	Canterbury	1970s	2019, 1998	7,580 m^{2}	47	55	FreshChoice
Mid City Plaza	36.8500898°S 174.7625409°E	Napier Central	Napier	Hawke's Bay	1920	2017	3,177 m^{2}	9	20	No anchor tenant
Milford Centre	36.7716401°S 174.7635697°E	Milford	Devonport-Takapuna	Auckland	1994	2017, 2006	14,000 m^{2}	65	757	The Warehouse, Woolworths
Mt Wellington Shopping Centre	36.9088176°S 174.8351973°E	Mount Wellington	Maungakiekie-Tāmaki	Auckland	1994	Unknown	9,000 m^{2}	22	Unknown	Woolworths, Supercheap Auto
North City Shopping Centre	41.1371622°S 174.8382684°E	Porirua Central	Porirua	Wellington	1990	Unknown	8,100 m^{2}	102	1,100	Farmers, New World, Kmart, Reading Cinemas
Northlands	43.4929801°S 172.6073226°E	Papanui	Christchurch	Canterbury	1967	2018, 2012, 2004, 1990s	40,921 m^{2}	121	1,663	The Warehouse, Pak'nSave, Woolworths, Farmers, Hoyts Cinemas
Northtown Mall	44.3824658°S 135.3785876°E	Waimataitai	South Canterbury	Canterbury	Mid-1990s	2016	Unknown	Unknown	Unknown	Pak'nSave
NorthWest Shopping Centre	36.8178521°S 174.6088857°E	Westgate	Henderson-Massey	Auckland	2015	Unknown	32,500 m^{2}	100	1100	Farmers, Countdown
Northwood Supa Centre	43.4603682°S 172.6225196°E	Belfast	Christchurch	Canterbury	2000s	Unknown	33,062 m^{2}	29	Unknown	Harvey Norman
Ocean Boulevard Mall	39.4910545°S 176.9149091°E	Napier Central	Napier	Hawke's Bay	1976	2007	Unknown	20	120	Bed Bath & Beyond
O'Connells Shopping Centre	45.031619°S 168.6586375°E	Queenstown	Queenstown Lakes	Otago	1990	2022	Unknown	4	0	No anchor tenant
Okara Park Shopping Centre	35.731003°S 174.328902°E	Morningside	Whangārei	Northland	1990	Unknown	Unknown	Unknown	Unknown	The Warehouse, Woolworths, Kmart
Ormiston Town Centre	36.96489°S 174.91328°E	Flat Bush	Howick	Auckland	2021	None	30,000 m^{2}	Unknown	Unknown	New World, Hoyts, The Warehouse, Noel Leeming
Pakuranga Plaza	36.9125797°S 174.8708143°E	Pakuranga	Howick	Auckland	1965	2000s, 1989	28,000 m^{2}	80	1,400	Farmers, Woolworths The Warehouse
The Palms	43.5066018°S 172.6618335°E	Shirley	Christchurch	Canterbury	1996	2011, 2003, 1990s	35,500 m^{2} (2 floors)	97	1450	Farmers, Woolworths, Reading Cinemas
Papamoa Plaza	37.6990175°S 176.280167°E	Papamoa	Tauranga	Bay of Plenty	1997	2017	14,120 m^{2}	39	650	Woolworths, The Warehouse
The Plaza	36.848829°S 174.7332382°E	Palmerston North Central	Palmerston North	Manawatū-Whanganui	1986	2009	32,201 m^{2}	103	1,251	Kmart, Farmers, Woolworths, JB Hi-Fi
Queensgate Shopping Centre	41.2099569°S 174.9042561°E	Hutt Central	Lower Hutt	Wellington	1986	2022, 2019, 2006, 1991	Unknown	134	Unknown	Farmers, The Warehouse, Woolworths, Event Cinemas, H&M, JB Hi-Fi, Bed Bath & Beyond
Queenstown Central Shopping Centre	45.0118422°S 168.7401572°E	Frankton	Queenstown Lakes	Otago	2018	Unknown	>4,000 m^{2}	45	250	Kmart
Queenstown Mall	45.0321524°S 168.6610831°E	Queenstowns	Queenstown Lakes	Otago	1864	1990s, 1970	Public mall	30	None	Reading Cinemas
Remarkables Park Town Centre	45.0263533°S 168.7398977°E	Frankton	Queenstown Lakes	Otago	1999	2015, 2013, 2010, 2008, 2007, 2006, 2004	>1,250 m^{2}	60	800	Harvey Norman, New World
Richmond Mall	41.3394162°S 173.1845041°E	Richmond	Tasman	Tasman	1973	Unknown	23,142 m^{2}	70	800	Farmers, Pak'nSave, FreshChoice
Rolleston Fields	43.595639°S 172.381604°E	Rolleston	Selwyn	Canterbury	2022	None	15,000 m^{2}	18	Unknown	No anchor tenant
Rolleston Square	43.5955747°S 172.3839715°E	Rolleston	Selwyn	Canterbury	2007	2020	23,000 m^{2}	45	850	Woolworths, The Warehouse
Rotorua Central	38.1408524°S 176.2491005°E	Rotorua Central	Rotorua Lakes	Bay of Plenty	1995	2015, 2013, 2006, 2004, 2000	48000m²	55	Unknown	The Warehouse, Harvey Norman, Woolworths, Farmers, Briscoes, Rebel Sport, Smiths City
Royal Oak Mall	36.9103582°S 174.7724866°E	Royal Oak	Puketāpapa	Auckland	1988	Unknown	Unknown	65	600	Pak'nSave
Shore City	36.7881001°S 174.7675074°E	Takapuna	Devonport-Takapuna	Auckland	1974	2018	14,900 m^{2}	63	826	Farmers, New World Metro
Silverdale Mall	36.613029°S 174.680309°E	Silverdale	Hibiscus and Bays	Auckland	2018	Unknown	Unknown	Unknown	Unknown	Farmers, Woolworths, The Warehouse
South City Mall	43.5379715°S 172.6331643°E	Appleby	Invercargill	Southland	1990	2015	Unknown	Unknown	Unknown	No anchor tenant
South City Shopping Centre	43.5379715°S 172.6331643°E	Christchurch CBD	Christchurch	Canterbury	1990	Unknown	2,700 m^{2}	33	550	Chemist Warehouse, JB Hi-Fi
Southgate Shopping Centre	37.048810°S 174.928845°E	Takanini	Manurewa	Auckland	2003	Unknown	Unknown	31	Unknown	Mitre 10 Mega, Briscoes
Southmall Manurewa	37.0224148°S 174.8943352°E	Manurewa	Manurewa	Auckland	1967	1987	Unknown	50	400	New World
Sylvia Park	36.9139365°S 174.8388466°E	Mount Wellington	Maungakiekie-Tāmaki	Auckland	2006	2020	106,427 m^{2} (2 floors)	250	4,053	The Warehouse, Warehouse Stationery, Farmers, Kmart, Pak'nSave, Hoyts Cinemas, H&M, JB Hi-Fi,
Takanini Town Centre	37.048070°S 174.931888°E	Takanini	Manurewa	Auckland	2021	Unknown	Unknown	39	450	The Warehouse
The Tannery	43.5568439°S 172.6781267°E	Woolston	Christchurch	Canterbury	2013	Unknown	Unknown	60	Unknown	Deluxe Cinemas
Tauranga Crossing	37.7379036°S 176.1021862°E	Tauriko	Tauranga	Bay of Plenty	2016	Unknown	45, 637 m^{2} (2 floors)	70	1,700	The Warehouse, Pak'nSave, Warehouse Stationery, Noel Leeming, Event Cinemas, H&M,
Tower Junction	43.5386415°S 172.6002776°E	Addington	Christchurch	Canterbury	2002	2018	37,000 m^{2}	40	Unknown	Bunnings, Number One Shoes, Toyworld, Bed Bath & Beyond
The Valley Mega Centre	39.0481262°S 174.1112655°E	Waiwhakaiho	New Plymouth	Taranaki	2006	2009, 2008	30,000 m^{2}	5	324	Mitre 10 Mega, Woolworths, Rebel Sport, Briscoes, Noel Leeming
Wainuiomata Mall	41.26058°S 174.9418998°E	Wainuiomata	Lower Hutt	Wellington	1969	2020	Unknown	10	200	Woolworths, The Warehouse
Waipapa Shopping Centre	35.210200°S 173.918530°E	Waipapa	Far North	Northland	2008	Unknown	10,000 m^{2}	Unknown	Unknown	The Warehouse, Mitre 10
WestCity Waitakere	36.8808089°S 174.6303359°E	Henderson	Henderson-Massey	Auckland	1974	2004, 2001, 1997	50,000 m^{2} (3 floors)	130	1,492	The Warehouse, Farmers, Woolworths, Event Cinemas (8 screens)
Westfield Albany	36.7271835°S 174.7086788°E	Albany	Upper Harbour	Auckland	1990s	2007	53,326 m^{2} (2 floors)	140	2,373	Farmers, Kmart, New World, JB Hi-Fi, Event Cinemas
Westgate Lifestyle	36.8137279°S 174.6072851°E	Westgate	Henderson-Massey	Auckland	2017	Unknown	25,604 m^{2}	28	622	Harvey Norman, Briscoes, Rebel Sport, Freedom Furniture
Westfield Manukau City	36.9912101°S 174.8800811°E	Manukau Central	Ōtara-Papatoetoe	Auckland	1976	2007, 1992, 1986	45,236 m^{2} (2 floors)	187	2,113	Farmers, Woolworths, JB Hi-Fi, Event Cinemas
Westfield Newmarket	36.8710078°S 174.7748681°E	Newmarket	Waitematā	Auckland	1988	2019	86,879 m^{2} (5 floors)	256	3,110	David Jones, Farmers, Woolworths, Event Cinemas
Westfield Riccarton	43.5310205°S 172.5955873°E	Riccarton	Christchurch	Canterbury	1965	2009, 2004, 1990s	55,076 m^{2} (2 floors)	188	2400	Farmers, Kmart, Pak'nSave, JB Hi-Fi, Hoyts Cinemas, Rebel Sport, H&M,
Westgate Shopping Centre	36.8194133°S 174.610889°E	Westgate	Henderson-Massey	Auckland	1998	Unknown	18,916 m^{2}	88	1350	The Warehouse, Woolworths
Westfield St Lukes	36.8828849°S 174.7310111°E	Mount Albert	Albert-Eden	Auckland	1971	2003, 1991	39,764 m^{2} (3 floors)	171	2,018	Farmers, Kmart, Woolworths, Event Cinemas

== See also ==
- List of retailers in New Zealand
- Retailing in New Zealand
- Hospitality industry in New Zealand
