= Roger Bhatnagar =

New Zealand businessman (1942–2022)

Sir Roger Bhatnagar KNZM
- Born: Rajeshwar Sarup Bhatnagar; 26 October 1942; British Raj
- Died: 7 November 2022 (aged 80); Ellerslie, New Zealand
- Occupation: Businessman

Sir Rajeshwar Sarup "Roger" Bhatnagar KNZM (26 October 1942 – 7 November 2022) was an Indian-born New Zealand businessman known for his association with the consumer electronics chain Noel Leeming.

== Early life ==
Bhatnagar was born in India on 26 October 1942, and grew up in New Delhi. In the 1960s he travelled the world, occasionally sleeping rough due to a shortage of money. He settled for a while in Canada, where he worked in electronics retail in British Columbia. He married a New Zealand-born woman in Canada, where he had a number of children.

== New Zealand ==
Bhatnagar migrated to New Zealand with his family from Canada in 1980. The same year he opened his first home audio store in central Auckland, and it quickly grew into the Sound Plus chain. In 1991, he purchased the Noel Leeming chain, in receivership at that time, for around $3 million with his business associate, Greg Lancaster, from Smiths City. In 1993, Noel Leeming was listed on the New Zealand Stock Exchange with a market capitalisation of about $26 million and in 1995 the company was the subject of a failed $56 million takeover bid by Skellerup. The following year, Noel Leeming merged with competitor Bond & Bond to form Pacific Retail. In 1998, Bhatnagar stepped down as chairman and an executive director of Pacific Retail, and he divested his interests in the company in 1999.

In 1993, Bhatnagar was involved in setting up Burger King in New Zealand, but sold his 50 percent interest two years later. He retired from active involvement in business in 2007.

== Philanthropy ==
In 1997 Bhatnagar's wealth was estimated as $28 million. Bhatnagar supported a number of charitable causes in New Zealand, including the New Zealand Breast Cancer Foundation, child cancer and diabetes. In 1997, he donated $250,000 to the Breast Cancer Foundation. In 2017, Bhatnagar's collection of cricket memorabilia was donated to Auckland Cricket, and it was put on permanent display at the Bert Sutcliffe Lounge at Eden Park.

== Death ==
Bhatnagar died in the Auckland suburb of Ellerslie on 7 November 2022, aged 80. His death, at Summerset Heritage Park retirement village, followed a long illness and a stroke in 2009.

== Honours ==
In the 1998 Queen's Birthday Honours, Bhatnagar was appointed a Knight Companion of the New Zealand Order of Merit, for services to business and the community, becoming the first person of Indian descent to be knighted in New Zealand.
