= 2021 Countdown stabbing =

2021 Countdown stabbing may refer to:

- 2021 Dunedin Countdown stabbing, which occurred in Dunedin, New Zealand, on 10 May
- 2021 Auckland Countdown stabbing, which occurred in Auckland, New Zealand, on 3 September
