= Tauranga Crossing =

Shopping mall in Tauranga, New Zealand

Coordinates: 37°44′14.02″S 176°6′19.84″E

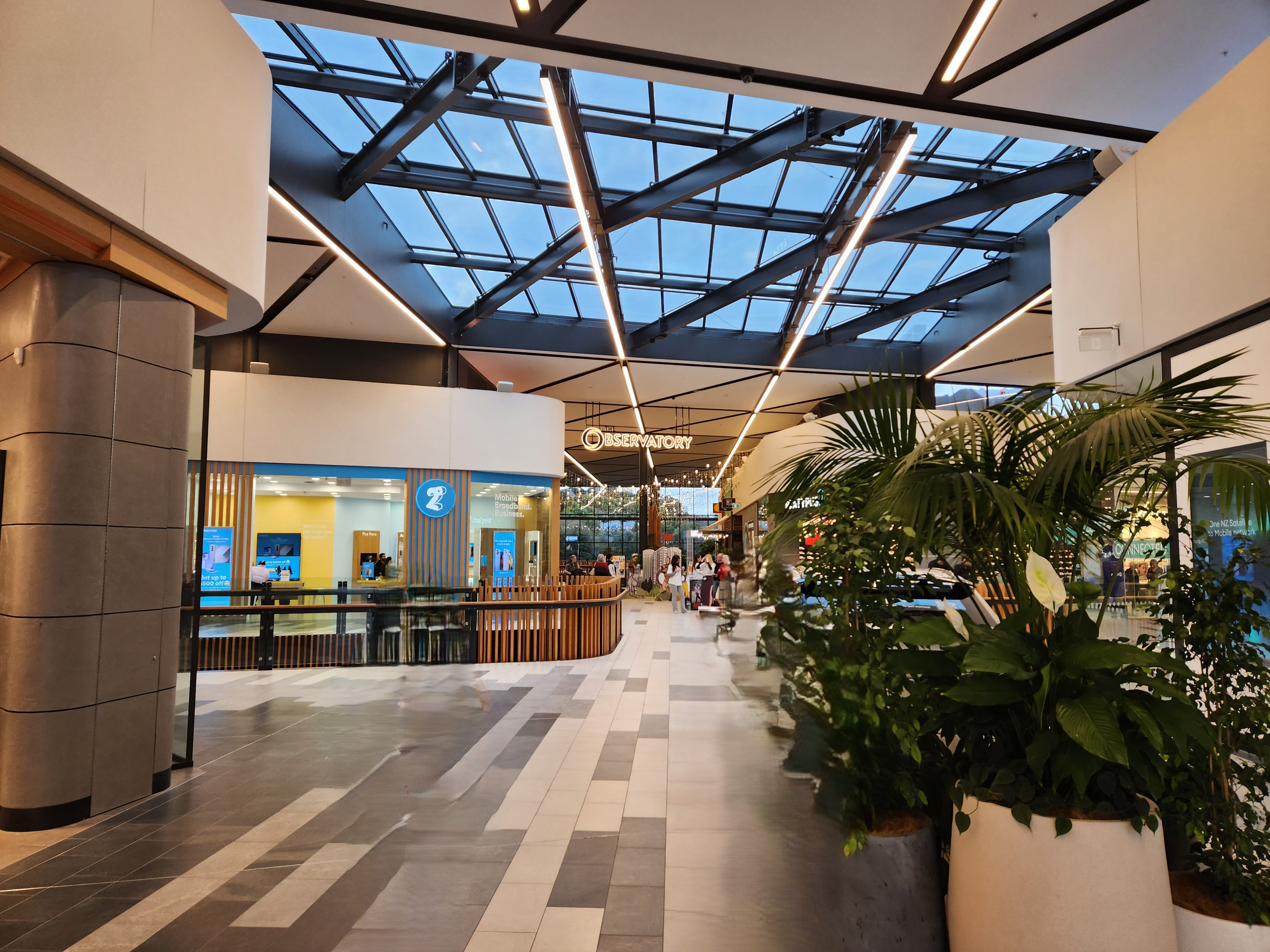
- Interior of Tauranga Crossing in 2024
- Location: Tauranga, New Zealand
- Opened: 27 September 2016
- Num. of stores: 120+
- Num. of anchor tenants: 4
- Floor area: 47,000 sq.m
- Floors: 2
- Parking: 1800

Tauranga Crossing is a shopping mall in Tauranga, New Zealand, located at 2 Taurikura Drive, Tauriko. It features more than 70 shops and 25 eateries. It has four anchor stores — Pak'nSave, The Warehouse, Warehouse Stationery, Noel Leeming.

== Development ==
Stage one of the mall opened in September 2016 with 20 specialty stores and four anchor tenants: Pak'nSave, The Warehouse, Noel Leeming, and Warehouse Stationery. H&M also opened in the mall, it was its fifth store in New Zealand.

Stage two opened on 4 April 2019 with the addition of 45 new stores, 17 new dining options, and an 800-seat six-screen Event Cinemas complex with Vmax screen. The $150m expansion brought the total number of stores and eating places to more than 100 and provides employment for about 1,000 people.

Tauranga Crossing is still being developed in stages and is expected to have 70,000sq m of retail space on completion. As of 2021, the mall has more than 120 tenants, occupying more than 45,000sq m of lettable space.

== See also ==
- List of shopping centres in New Zealand
