= New Lynn War Memorial Library =

Library in Auckland, New Zealand

- Te Pātaka Kōrero o Te Rewarewa
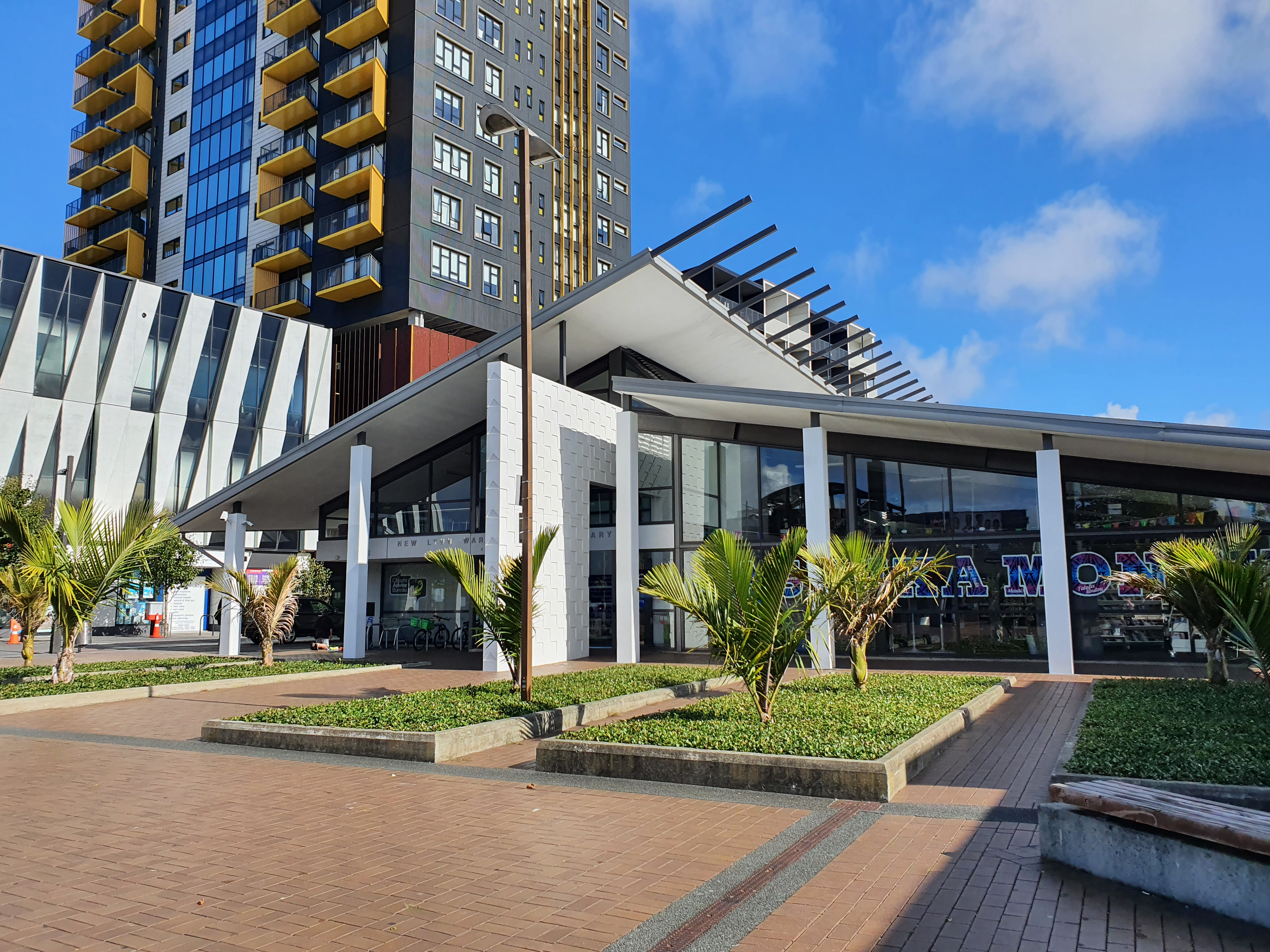
- Memorial Square frontage of New Lynn War Memorial Library, April 2022
- 36°54′31″S 174°41′00″E
- Location: 3 Memorial Drive, New Lynn, Auckland, New Zealand
- Type: Public library
- Established: 1956; 70 years ago
- Architect: Craig Craig Moller (2005 building)
- Branch of: Auckland Libraries

Collection
- Size: Floating

Other information
- Website: Official website

New Lynn War Memorial Library (Māori: Te Pātaka Kōrero o Te Rewarewa) is a public library located in New Lynn, West Auckland, New Zealand. Opening in 1956 as part of a planned community centre precinct and World War I memorial, the original library was demolished and redeveloped in 2005. Memorial Square at the entrance to the museum was redeveloped in 1998 to a design by landscape architect Megan Wraight. The square incorporates brick columns and a sunken waka sculpture, added in 2000 and designed by Te Kawerau ā Maki carvers Sunnah Thompson and Rewi Spraggon.

== History ==
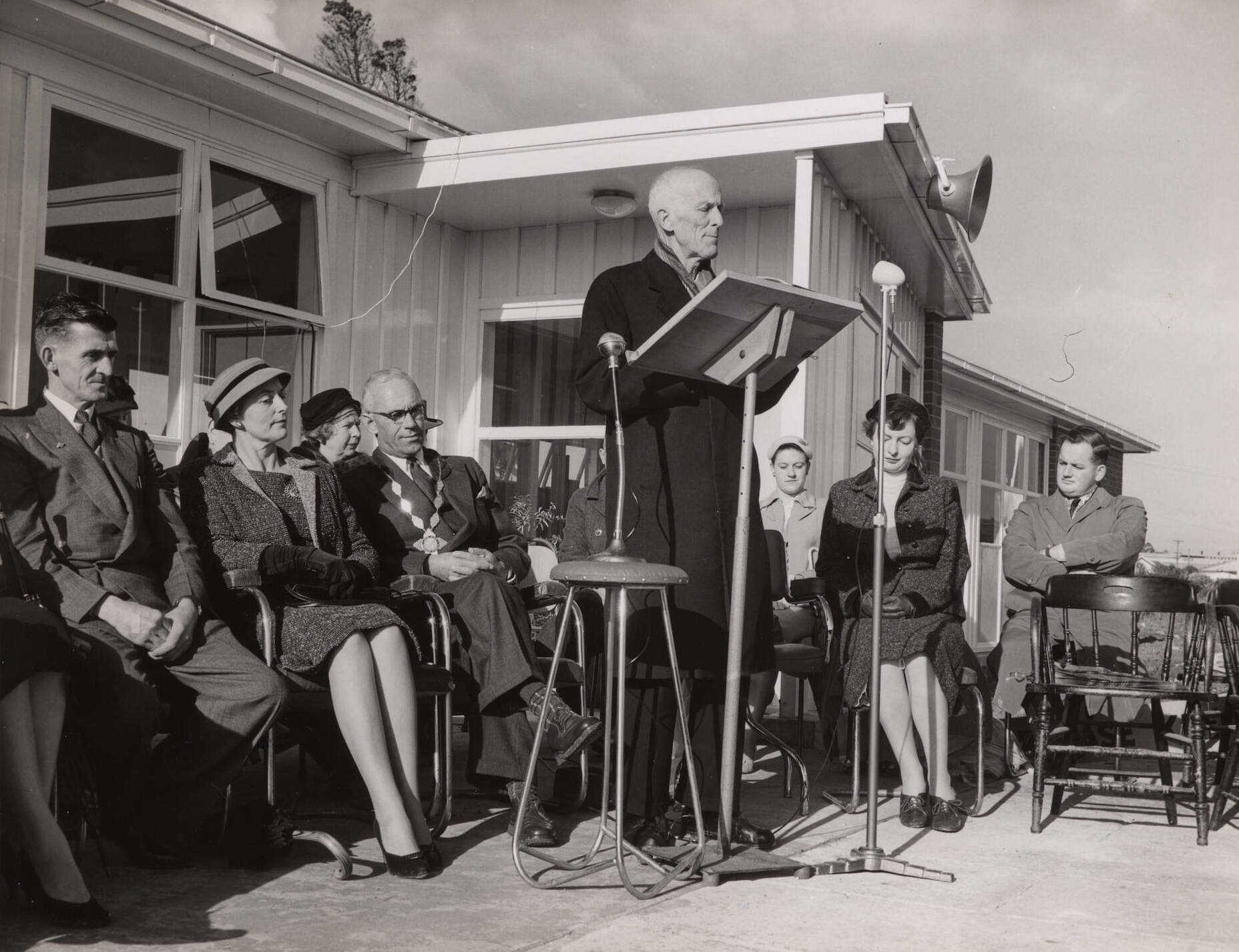
Opening ceremony for the New Lynn library in May 1957

The New Lynn Borough Council began planning a multi-purpose community centre in 1945, which by 1947 had developed into a community centre and war memorial. This centre was envisioned as a complex that would incorporate a public library, council chambers, a kindergarten and courts for sports. Planned in 1954 by Gummer, Ford and Partners, the first section of this community precinct was opened on 28 April 1956 with the construction of Plunket rooms (these were later relocated), followed by the library in May 1957. The New Lynn War Memorial Cenotaph, a memorial to the 16 soldiers from New Lynn who died in World War I, was unveiled by the governor-general, Lord Cobham, on 25 April 1958. The original design included a bronze triptych designed by Richard Gross, and the memorial was originally known by the name Memorial Avenue.

In 1963, further developments to the community centre were made after the opening of LynnMall, the first major American-style shopping centre in Auckland, adjacent to the library. During this time, Memorial Avenue was renamed to Memorial Square. The square was redeveloped in 1974 as a paved facility, that incorporated drinking fountains, seats, trees and an artistic rock mound. Further changed to the square were made in 1984.

=== Memorial Square redevelopment ===
Memorial Square was redeveloped in the late 1990s, rededicated on 11 November 1998, based on a plan by landscape architect Megan Wraight. The square's new design incorporates s grid of brick pillars, intended by Wraight to represent soldiers in drill formation, and as a reflection of the brick industry of New Lynn. Water runs down pillars, intending to symbolise tears shed by loved ones of the soldiers. Richard Gross's bronze plates from the original cenotaph were dismantled, and incorporated into the brick pillars. The brick pillars also act as stakes for red and white roses that grow on the pillars.

On ANZAC Day 2000, additional sculptures were added to Memorial Square. Created by Te Kawerau ā Maki carvers Sunnah Thompson and Rewi Spraggon, the artwork represents a sunken waka pointing north, with tōtara inserts marking a diagonal line across the square. Two sculptures represent the tauihu (prow) and taurapa (stern-post) of the waka. The tauihu is a kauri carving set on stainless steel, while the taurapa sculpture is a stylised stainless steel structure.

On 20 April 2001, Frank Hitchcock and Bruce Russell, two former prisoners of war, unveiled a brass plaque dedicated to 33 local soldiers who had died during World War I, World War II and the Korean War.

=== Library redevelopment ===
By 2000, the library had moved to a location inside LynnMall. Plans for a new library building began in 2003, as a part of the New Lynn revitalisation project, coinciding with the redevelopment of the New Lynn railway station. The new building was designed by architecture firm Craig Craig Moller, and was opened on 18 October 2005.

The new building was steel, concrete and brick two-storey building, designed under the Waitakere City Better Building Code. The new building incorporates artworks by Iona Mathieson, Sue Bridges, Te Warena Taua, Graeme Gash, Danny Rollinson and Philippa Crane, and has a permanent exhibition to the New Lynn ceramics industry.

In 2013, the Merchant Quarter residential and commercial development opened to the south of the library. During this period, the poppy wall on the library was relocated to the New Lynn RSA.

The library adopted a dual Māori language name, Te Pātaka Kōrero o Te Rewarewa, in March 2023. The name includes Te Rewarewa, the traditional Māori name for the New Lynn area, which translates as 'to float as one', referring to the waka and people that once floated down the nearby Whau River.

== Functions ==
The New Lynn War Memorial Library building houses the library, a branch of the Citizens Advice Bureau which opened in November 2005, and an information technology learning centre.

== Reception ==
The 2005 library building won a New Zealand Institute of Architects Auckland Branch Award in 2006. The library's community-focused design has been praised by sculptor John Edgar.

== Gallery ==
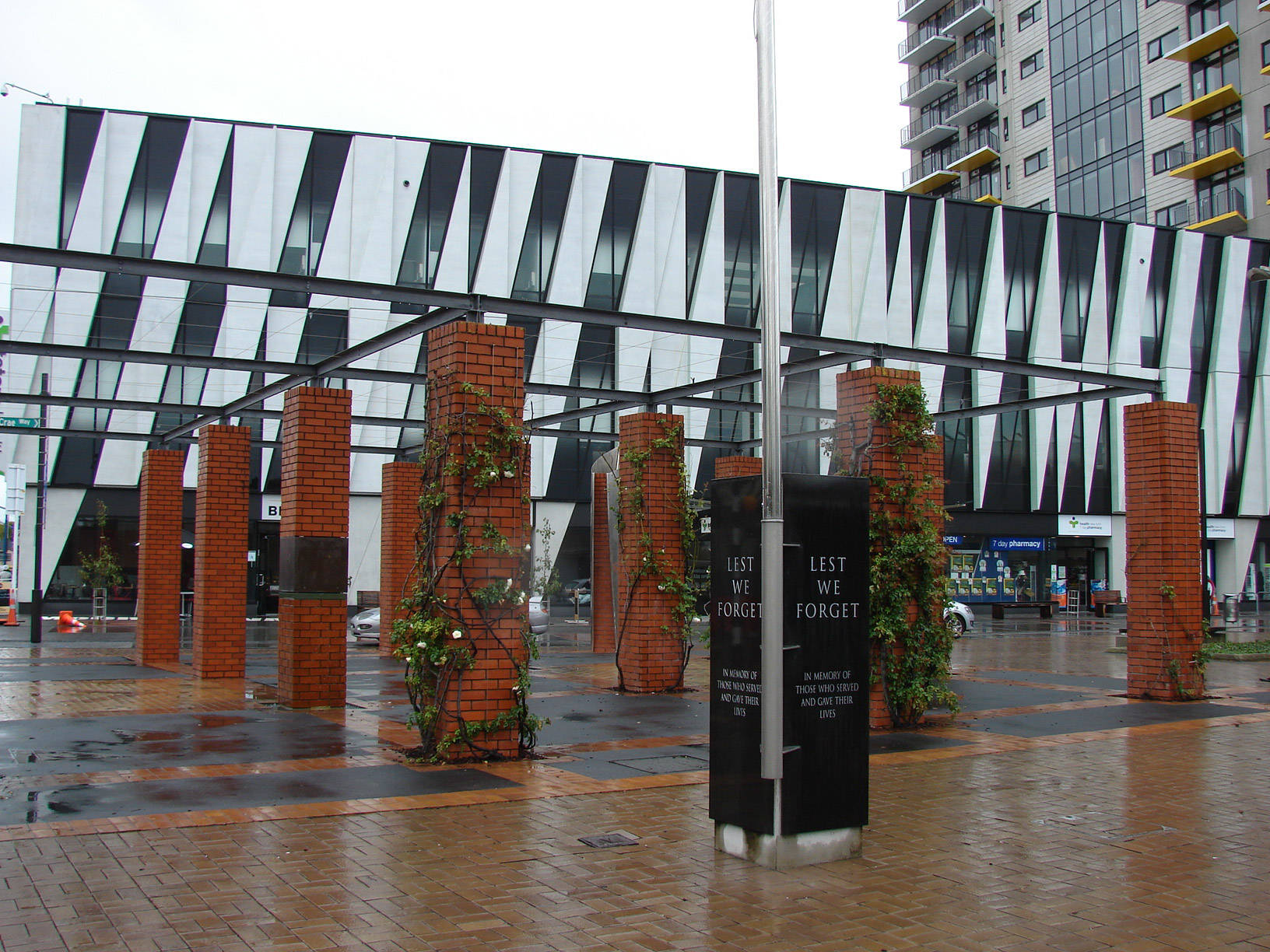
New Lynn Memorial Square in 2014

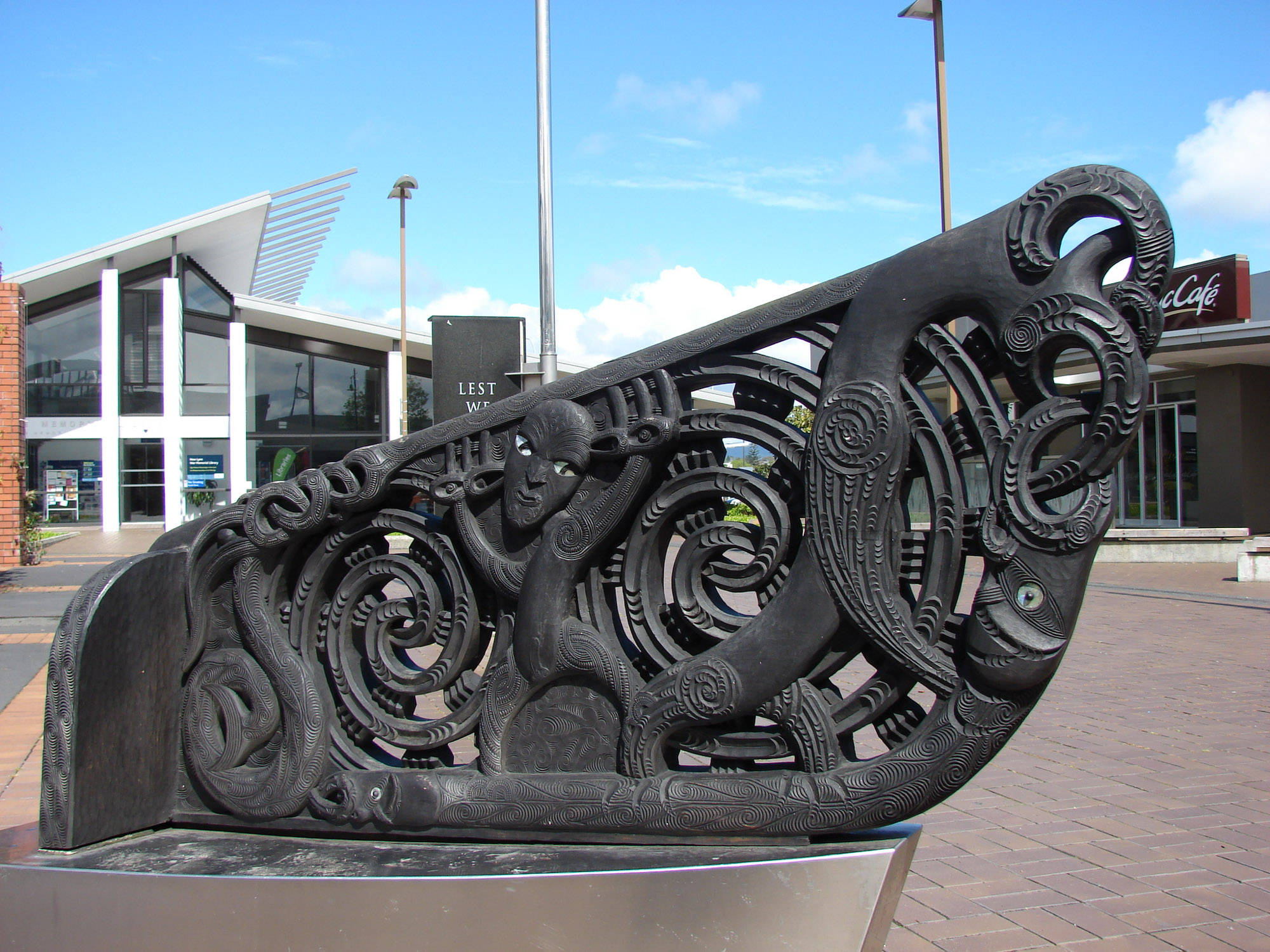
Northern Memorial Square waka sculpture, with the New Lynn War Memorial Library in background.

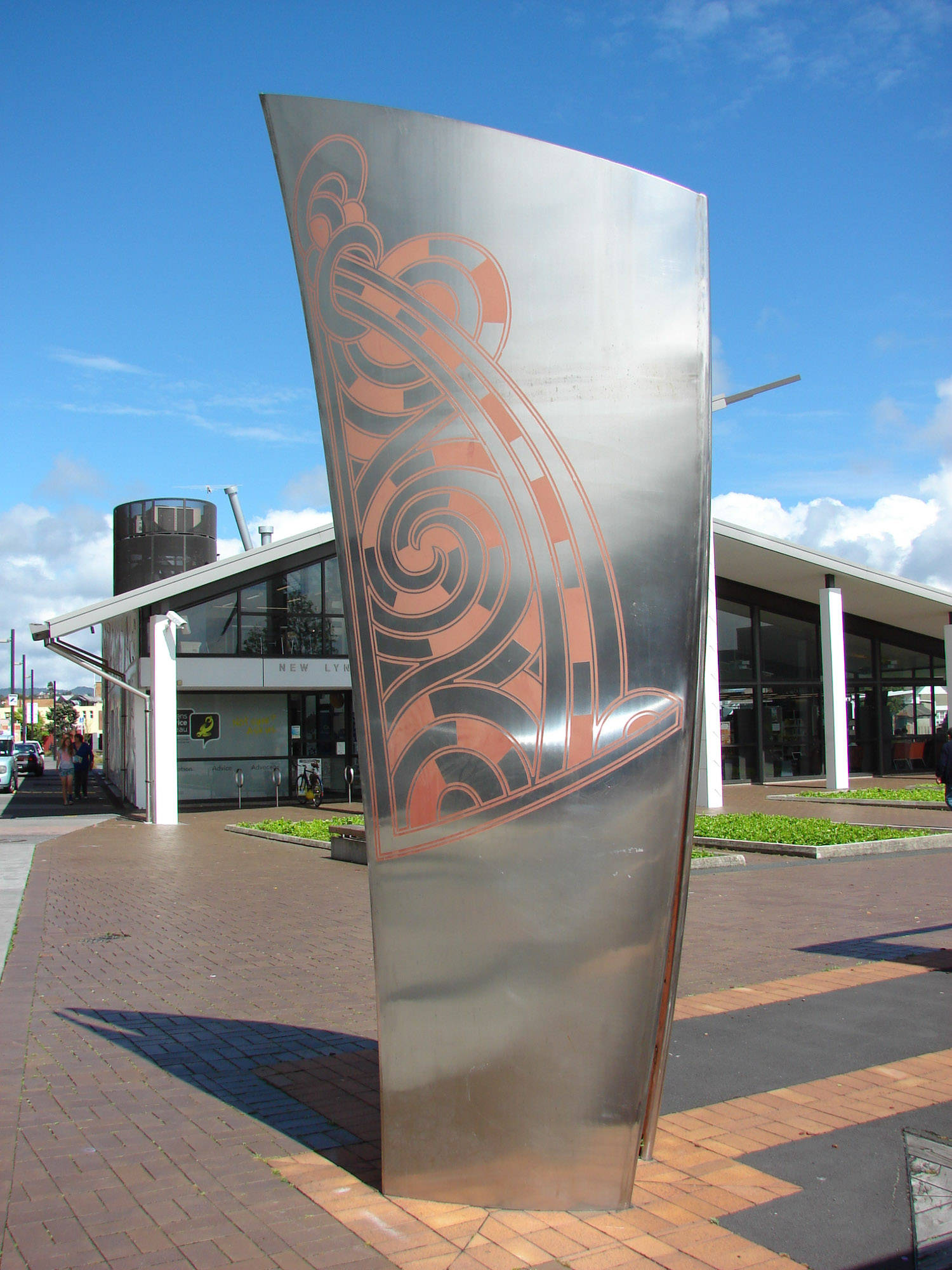
Southern Memorial Square waka sculpture, with the New Lynn War Memorial Library in background.

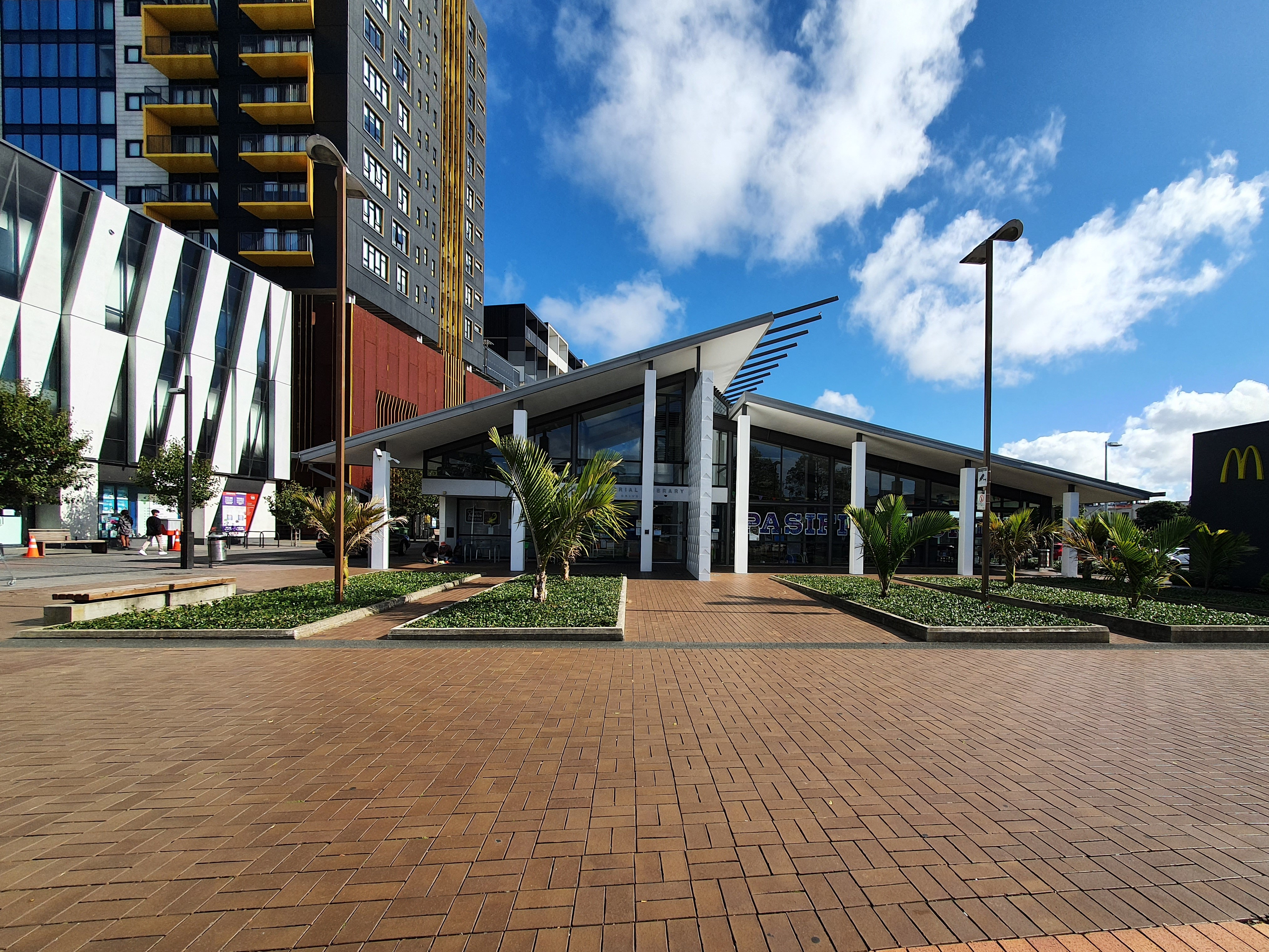
Wide view of New Lynn War Memorial Library in 2022
