= Westfield Riccarton =

Shopping mall in Christchurch, New Zealand

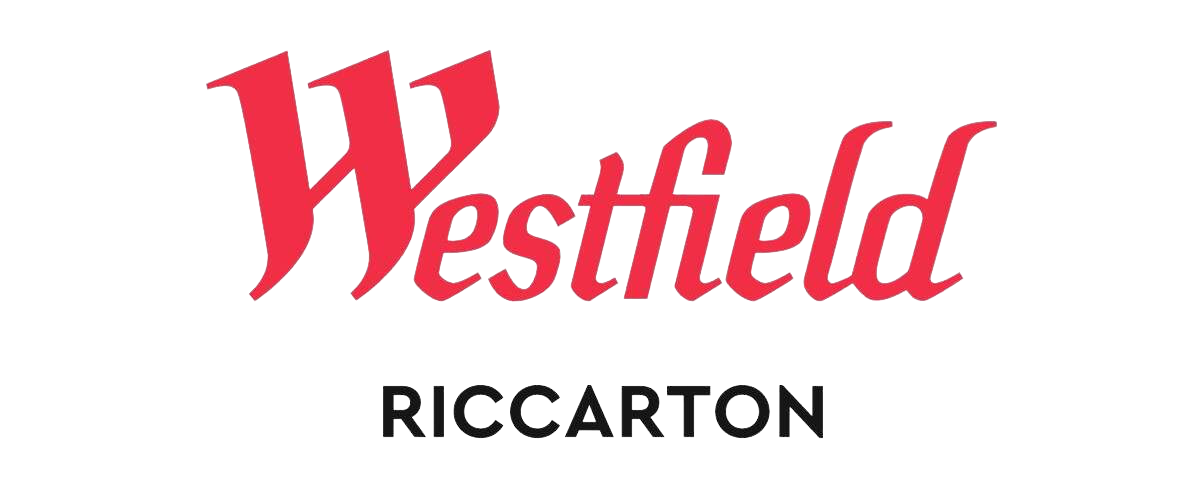

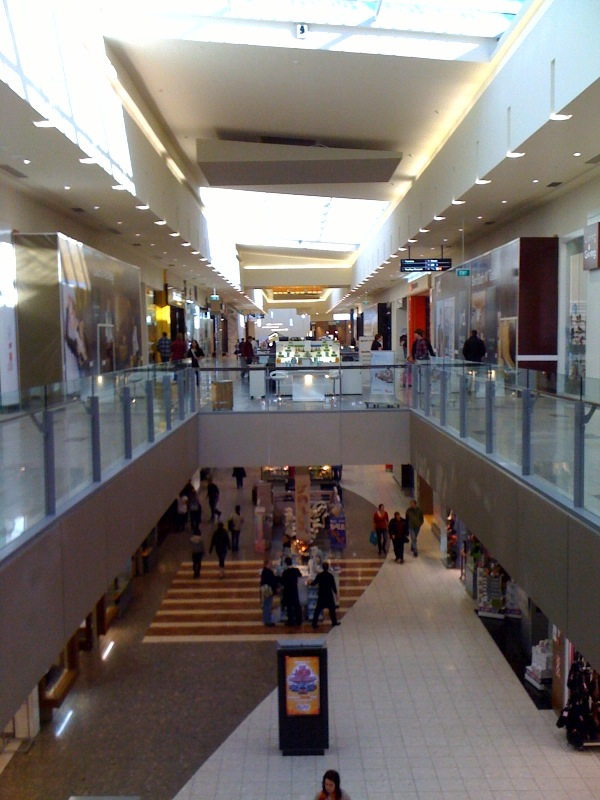
- Location: Riccarton, New Zealand
- Coordinates: 43°31′51.38″S 172°35′51.62″E
- Address: 129 Riccarton Road
- Opened: 3 November 1965; 61 years ago
- Developer: Riccarton Mall Ltd.
- Owner: Scentre Group
- Num. of stores: 162
- Num. of anchor tenants: 7
- Floor area: 54,000 m^{2} (580,000 sq ft)
- Floors: 2
- Parking: 2,400 (Lighted Lot, Parking garage)
- Website: www.westfield.co.nz/riccarton

Westfield Riccarton, also known by its former name Riccarton Mall, is a large retail complex located in the Christchurch, New Zealand, suburb of Riccarton. First opened on 3 November 1965, it is Christchurch's oldest shopping mall. The complex is currently anchored by Farmers, Kmart, H&M, Pak'nSave, Rebel Sport, Chemist Warehouse Group, JB Hi-Fi and Hoyts.

== History ==
=== Early history ===
Construction of Riccarton Mall began in February 1965. It was officially opened by John McAlpine, MP for Selwyn and Minister of Transport, on 2 November 1965 and opened to shoppers the following day. The initial mall covered 67,000 square feet (6,200 m^{2}) and cost £525,000 to construct ($22.6 million in December 2021 dollars). It contained 20 retailers including three anchor tenants: The Farmers' supermarket and department store (owned by the New Zealand Farmers' Co-operative Association of Canterbury), a Four Square-New World supermarket, and a McKenzie's department store.

A 20,000-square-foot (1,900 m^{2}) extension to the mall opened in November 1970 along with a fourth anchor tenant: Calder Mackay & Co. department store, which at the time had just been acquired by the Farmers Trading Company of Auckland. A new 20,000 sq ft (1,900 m^{2}) New World supermarket opened in July 1974, followed two months later by a 10,000-square-foot (930 m^{2}) extension housing four stores, bringing the mall to 123,000 square feet (11,400 m^{2}).

In November 1979, a third major extension opened and expanded the mall to 19,070 m^{2} (205,300 sq ft). The expansion included a 460 m^{2} (5,000 sq ft) Smiths City Market and 12 stores, bringing the mall to 50 stores.

Riccarton Mall was extensively remodeled in 1992 with most stores relocating to new premises within the mall; Farmers Trading Company (now simply Farmers) is one of the few stores to remain in its original location. The remodel introduced a food court into the mall and a new rooftop car park.

=== Westfield era ===
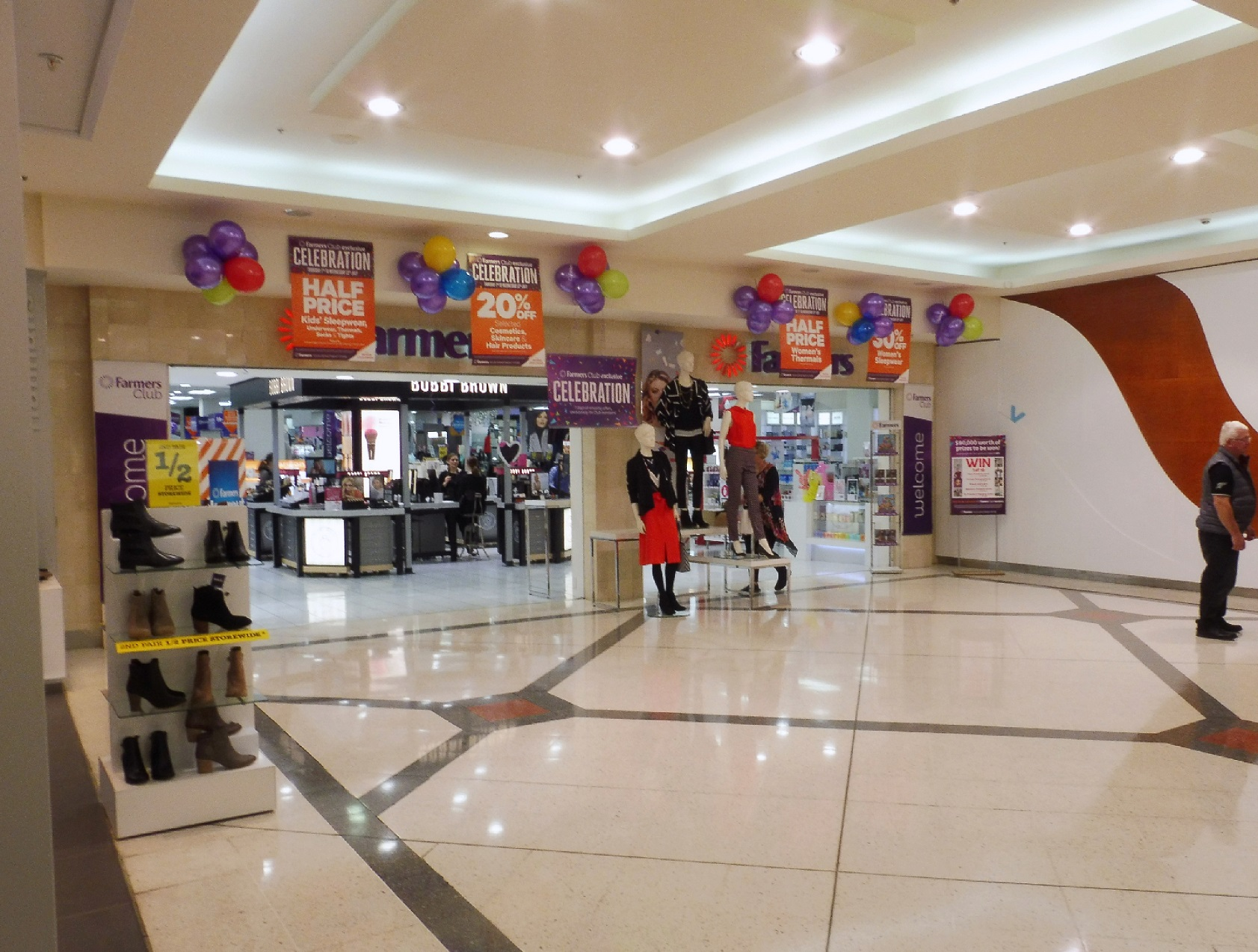
Farmers at Westfield Riccarton in July 2016

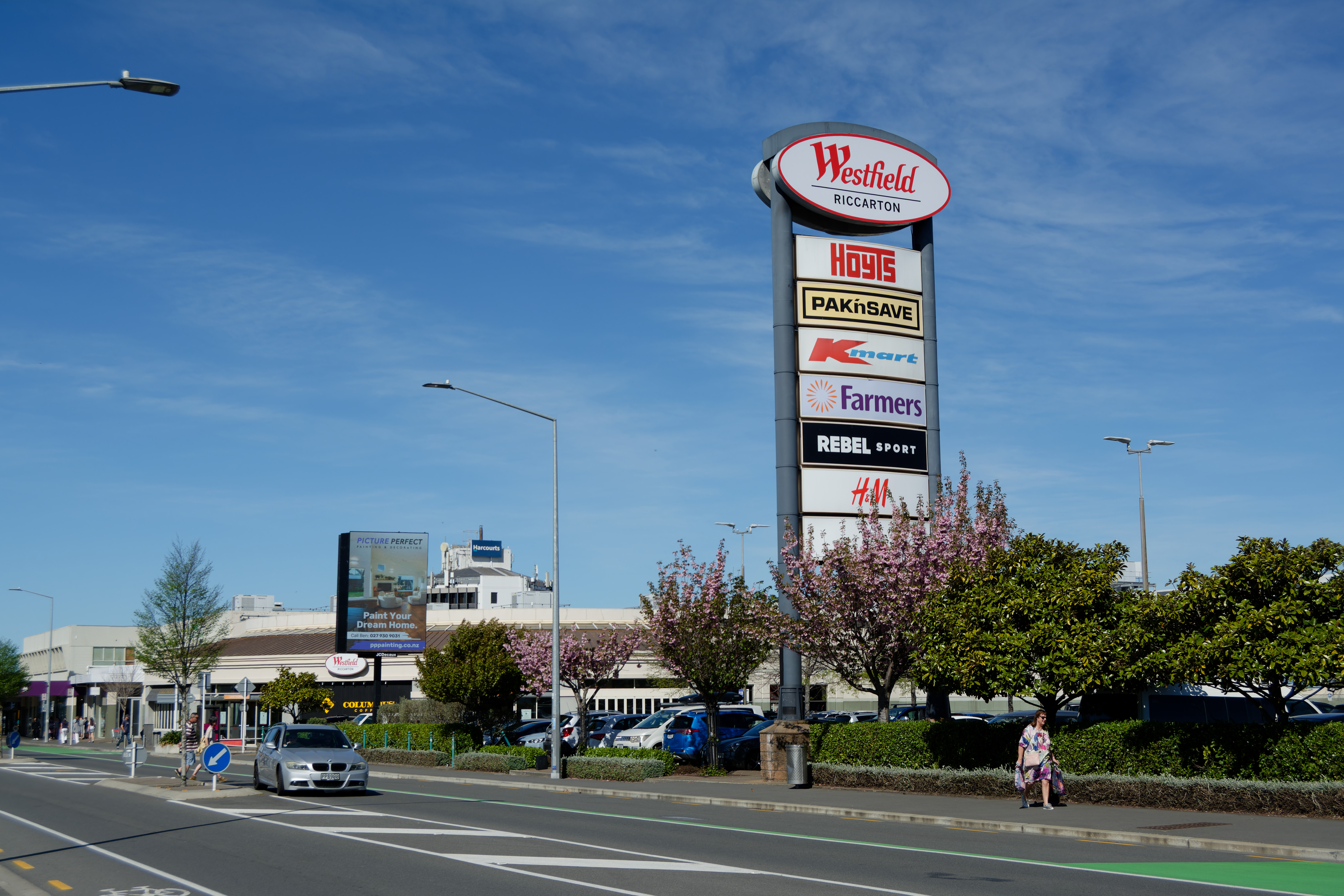
Signage for Westfield Riccarton

In 2003 the Westfield Group began a NZD$90 million redevelopment of the shopping centre which was completed in 2005. A strong focus of the redevelopment was a leisure component, with the introduction of the six-screen Hoyts Cinema multiplex, which features the second-largest projection screen in New Zealand. In addition to the cinema, a restaurant and café area was constructed at the Rotherham Street end of the mall.

On 28 May 2009, the mall opened phase one of a new $75m expansion.

The latest redevelopment included 40 new retailers and a new café court. An additional cinema screen was added to the existing Hoyts Multiplex. The first stage of development, a new four-level car park building with space for 400 cars, was completed in January 2009. The expansion increased the size of the mall to approximately 54,000 square metres.

Annual sales for the full year 2018 were $535.6 million.

== See also ==
- List of shopping centres in New Zealand
