= LynnMall =

Shopping mall in Auckland, New Zealand

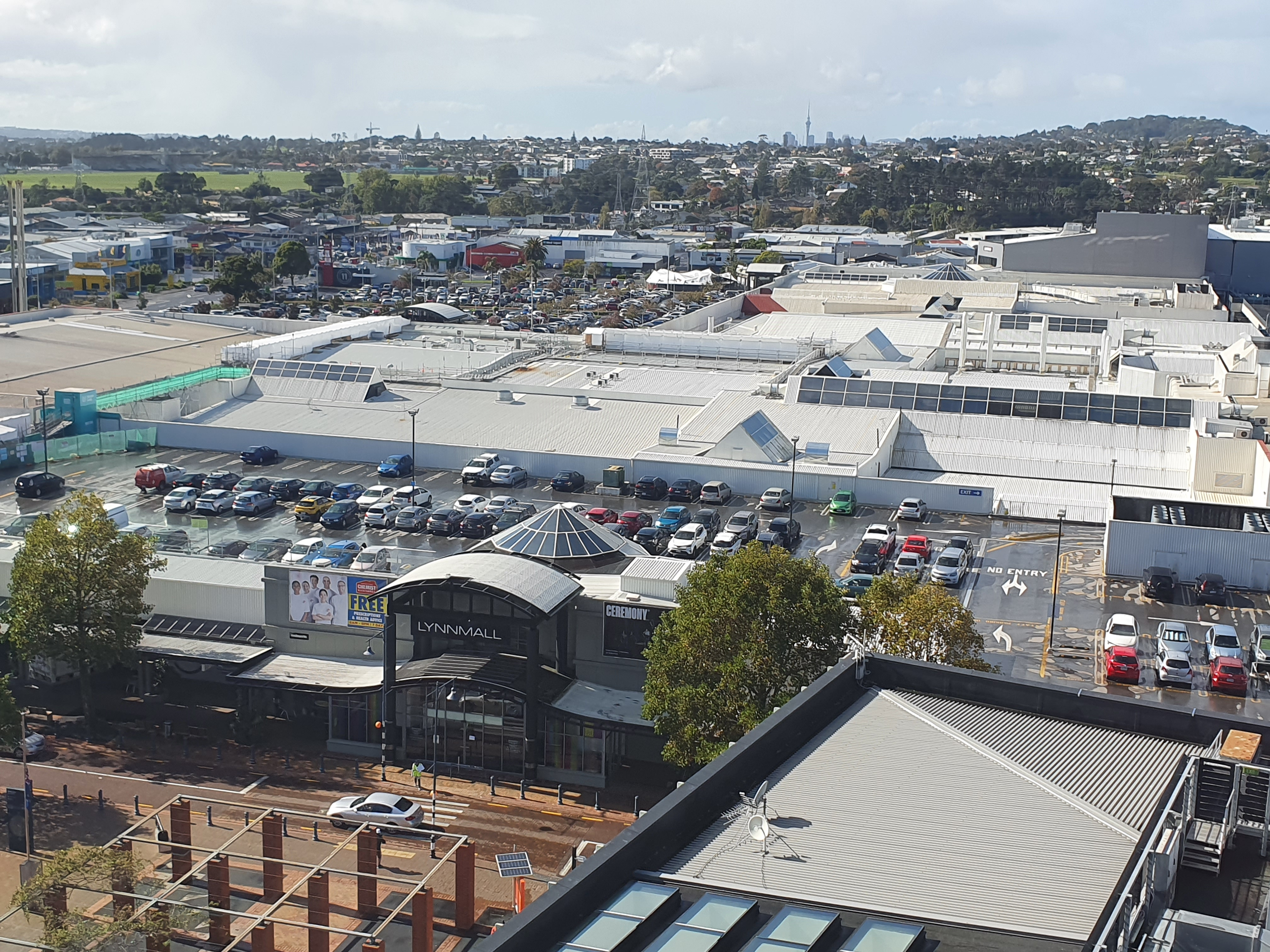
- Aerial view of LynnMall in 2022
- Location: New Lynn, Auckland, New Zealand
- Coordinates: 36°54′28″S 174°41′06″E
- Opened: 30 October 1963; 63 years ago
- Developer: Hammerson & Investment Trust of London
- Manager: Kiwi Property Group
- Owner: Kiwi Property acquired LynnMall in December 2010
- Architect: Walker, Lewis and Hillary & Co
- Num. of stores: 121
- Num. of anchor tenants: 3 – Farmers, Woolworths and Reading Cinemas
- Floor area: 31,853 m^{2} (342,860 ft^{2})
- Floors: 2
- Parking: 1216 car parks
- Website: lynnmall.co.nz

LynnMall is a shopping centre in New Lynn, a suburb of Auckland, New Zealand. Opened in October 1963, it was New Zealand's first shopping mall.

== History ==
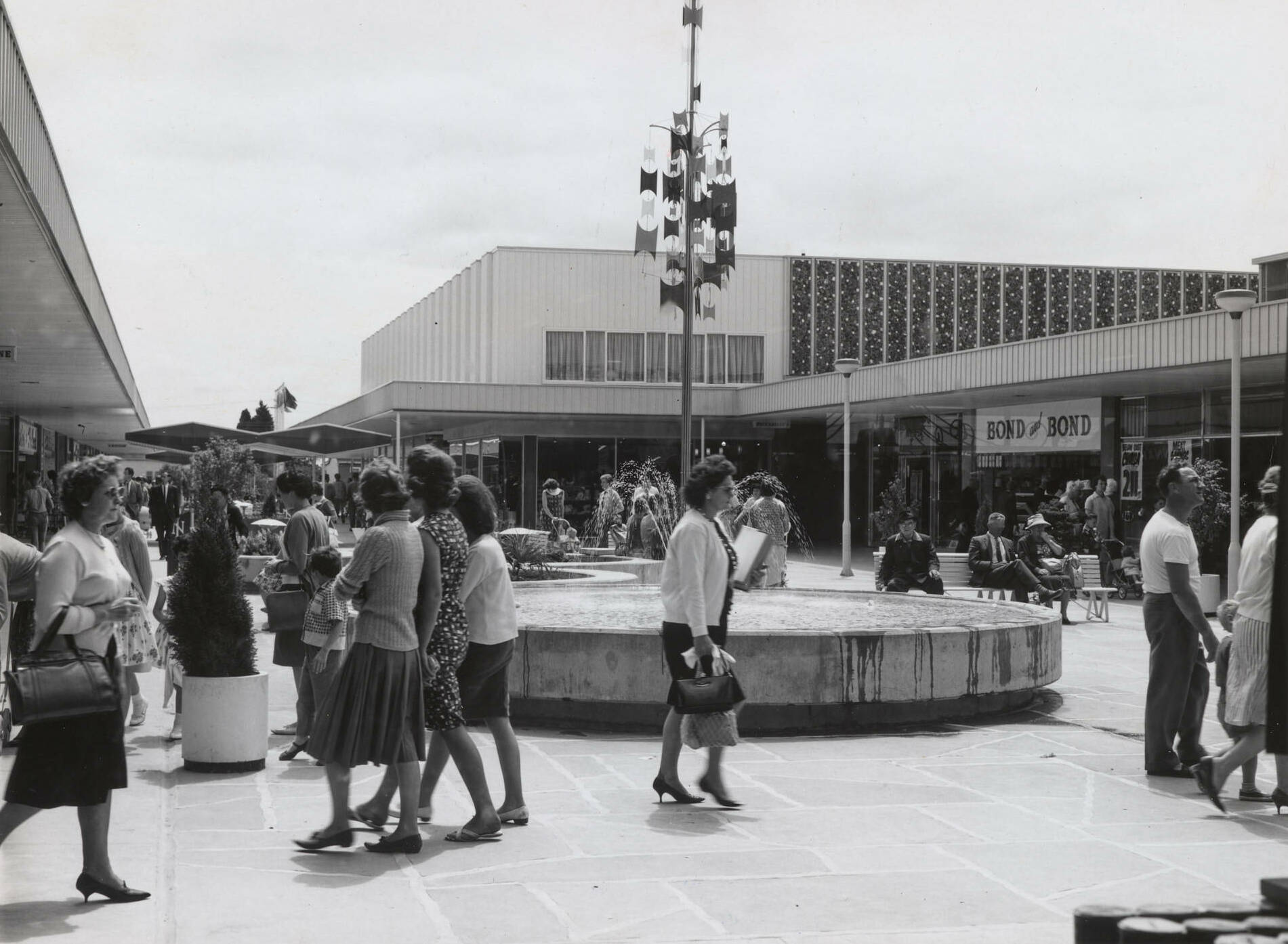
Shoppers at the newly opened LynnMall in 1963

British investment company Hammerson promoted the idea of developing a modern American-style shopping mall in suburban Auckland, choosing New Lynn as the site for this venture in the early 1960s due to the growth potential of the New Lynn area. The land was purchased from Bob McGrae of the Auckland Bus Company, and the mall was planned by architectural firm Livingstone Jones Lang Wootton. During planning stages, Auckland resident voiced concerns that the establishment of a large mall would take business away from suburban shopping streets in Avondale, New Lynn, and other areas of West Auckland. Warringah Mall in Sydney, a sister mall of LynnMall also developed by Hammerson, opened in April 1963.

Construction of the mall was undertaken by Cubitt Wells, taking approximately nine months at a cost of $1,000,000. LynnMall officially opened as New Zealand's first American-style suburban shopping centre on 30 October 1963, The construction of LynnMall led to further shopping centres developed by Hammerson and Livingstone Jones Lang Wootton across the country, including the Riccarton Mall in Christchurch in 1965 and Southmall Manurewa in 1967. LynnMall also inspired the Henderson Borough Council to create a competing mall, Henderson Square (now known as WestCity Waitakere), which opened in 1968.

The mall was extended in 1970, extending floor space from 90,000 square feet (8,400 m^{2}) to 150,000 square feet (14,000 m^{2}), making it the largest indoor shopping centre in New Zealand in the 1970s and 1980s. The mall saw further upgrades in 1999.

In January 2015, LynnMall commenced a $36 million expansion, named Brickworks, which included a new cinema, dining precinct and additional stores. In November that year, Brickworks officially opened to the public. Together with the existing Farmers department store and Countdown supermarket, the centre provides a shopping destination in the developing town centre of New Lynn.

Seven people were injured in a stabbing attack on 3 September 2021 at the mall, one of whom narrowly missed the knife but was still affected. The attacker Ahamed Samsudeen was shot and killed by police.

== See also ==
- List of shopping centres in New Zealand
