= WestCity Waitakere =

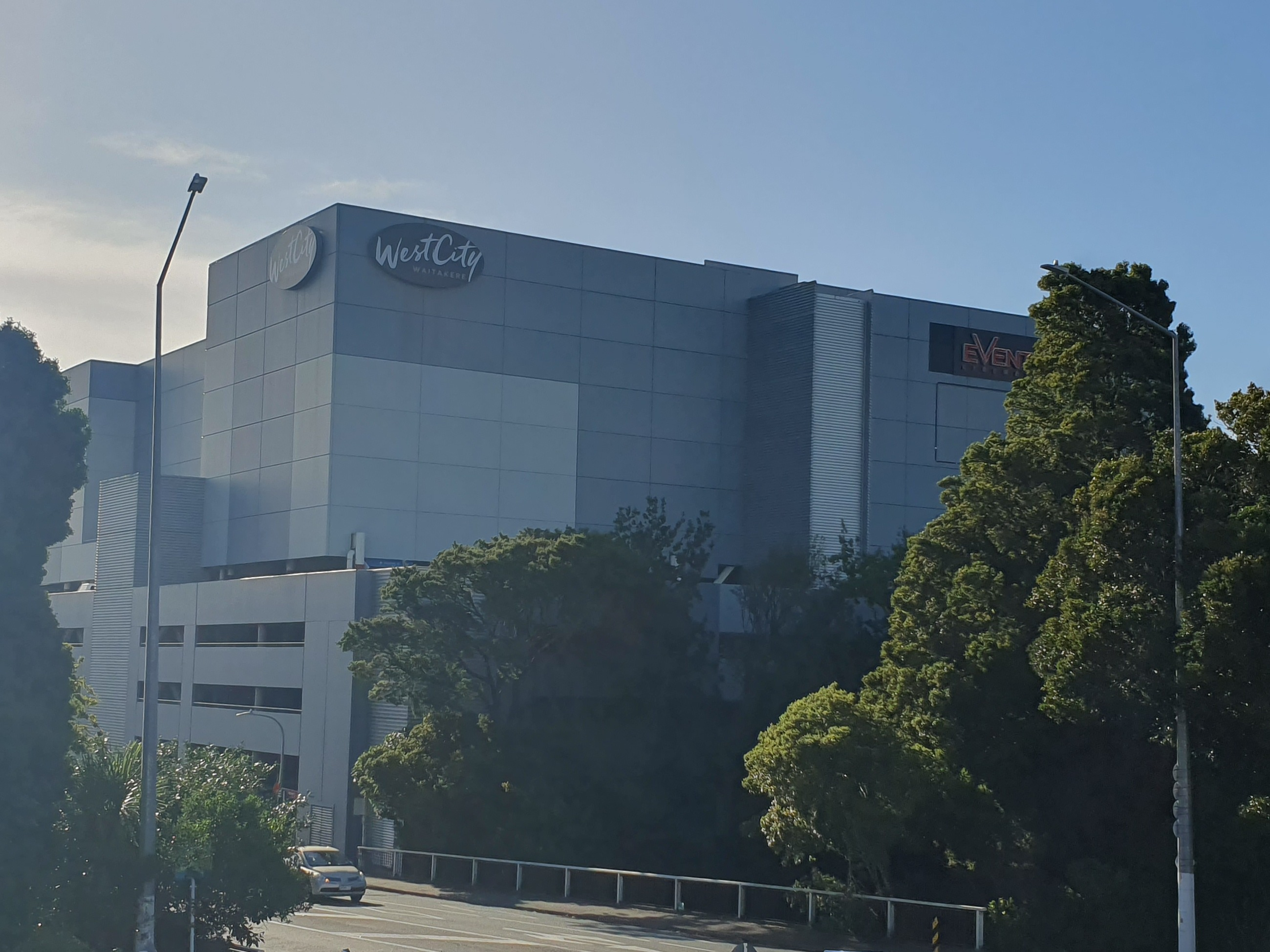
- Location: Henderson, Auckland
- Coordinates: 36°52′52″S 174°37′59″E
- Address: 7 Catherine Street, Henderson, Auckland 0612
- Opened: 1974; 52 years ago
- Manager: Colliers International
- Owner: Angaet Group
- Num. of stores: 130
- Num. of anchor tenants: 4
- Floor area: 36,921 m^{2} (397,414 sq ft)
- Floors: 3
- Parking: 1,492 spaces
- Website: /www.west-city.co.nz
- Information cited above in article or from Westfield.

WestCity Waitakere is a major regional shopping centre located in Henderson, a suburb in Auckland, New Zealand. It is 15.9 kilometres (9.9 mi) west of the Auckland CBD, and is immediately adjacent to The Boundary.

The centre has a current catchment area of 174,340 persons, and annual turnover at the centre for 2006 was $161.10 million NZD with 8.5 million visitors per year.

In February 2017, it was announced that owner Scentre Group had sold the mall, at the time named Westfield WestCity, to the family-owned Australian business Angaet Group for $147 million AUD.

== History and development ==
The shopping centre had its origins in the 1960s, when the Henderson Borough Council established it, with the first stage opened in 1968, with a Woolworth's store as the main tenant. The second and third stages followed by 1970, and by 1974 the centre rivalled LynnMall in size. In 1997, St Lukes Group redeveloped the centre and renamed it WestCity Shopping Centre, a name Westfield kept (plus the standardised 'Westfield' prefix) after purchase of the property. In 2000, Westfield began a 16-month, $80 million redevelopment program. The result was the first "Street" entertainment and leisure precinct in New Zealand, launched at WestCity in July 2001.

In a 2008 rating of New Zealand shopping centres by a RCG Retail, a retail expert group, Westfield WestCity received three out of four stars based on the criteria of amount of shopping area, economic performance, amenity and appeal as well as future growth prospects. The centre was renamed WestCity Waitakere after its sale to Angaet Group in 2017.

== Transport ==
The mall is accessible via the adjacent Henderson railway station and multiple AT Metro bus services. It has a taxi stand on Railside Avenue and bike stands located around the mall.

== Facilities ==
WestCity Waitakere has 130 stores across three floors, including an Event Cinemas cinema, a Woolworths supermarket and The Warehouse. It also has a multistorey car park with 1,492 spaces and a children's play area.

== See also ==
- List of shopping centres in New Zealand
