= Megan Wraight =

New Zealand landscape architect (1961-2020)

- Born: 12 December 1961; Rangiora, New Zealand
- Died: 31 August 2020 (aged 58)
- Education: RMIT University, Melbourne
- Occupation: Landscape architect
- Awards: NZ Arts Foundation Laureate Award
- Practice: Wraight + Associates Limited
- Website: www.waal.co.nz

Megan Mary Wraight (12 December 1961 – 31 August 2020) was a New Zealand landscape architect who had considerable influence on the design of public spaces. She was the founding principal of Wraight + Associates Limited, which has completed a wide variety of large-scale urban projects throughout New Zealand, including waterfront redevelopments, educational facilities, transport facilities and urban-renewal projects.

== Biography ==
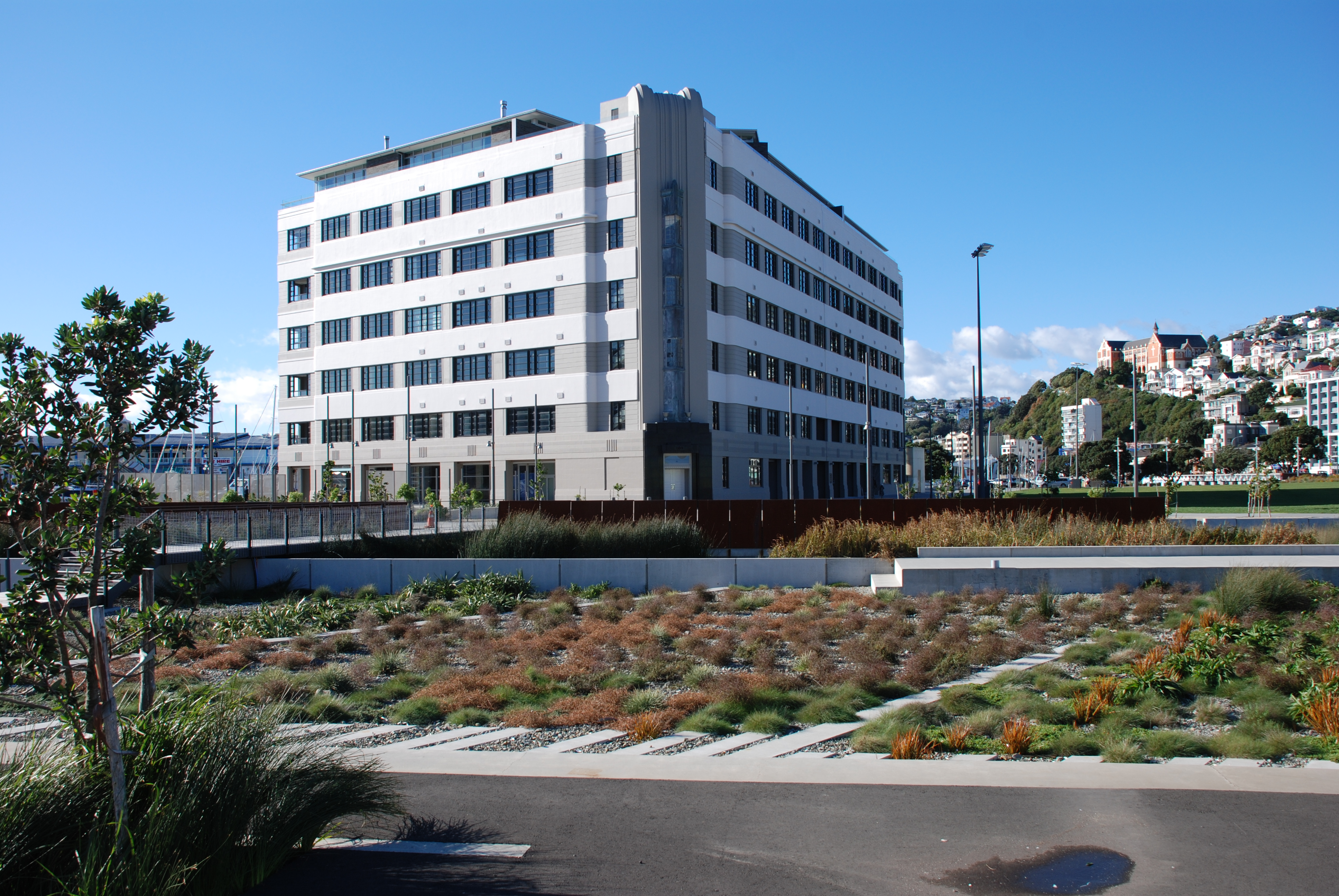
Waitangi Park plantings, 2007

Wraight was born in Rangiora and lived in rural settings there, Havelock North and Motueka as she was growing up.

Wraight completed a Bachelor of Landscape Architecture at RMIT University, Melbourne, in 1992. In 2006, she received the International Federation of Landscape Architect award, one of the industry's highest international honours, and in 2013 she was the first landscape architect to receive the Arts Foundation of New Zealand Laureate Award.

Wraight started her own practice in 1998 - Megan Wraight Landscape Architects. It was restructured into Wraight + Associates in 2003.

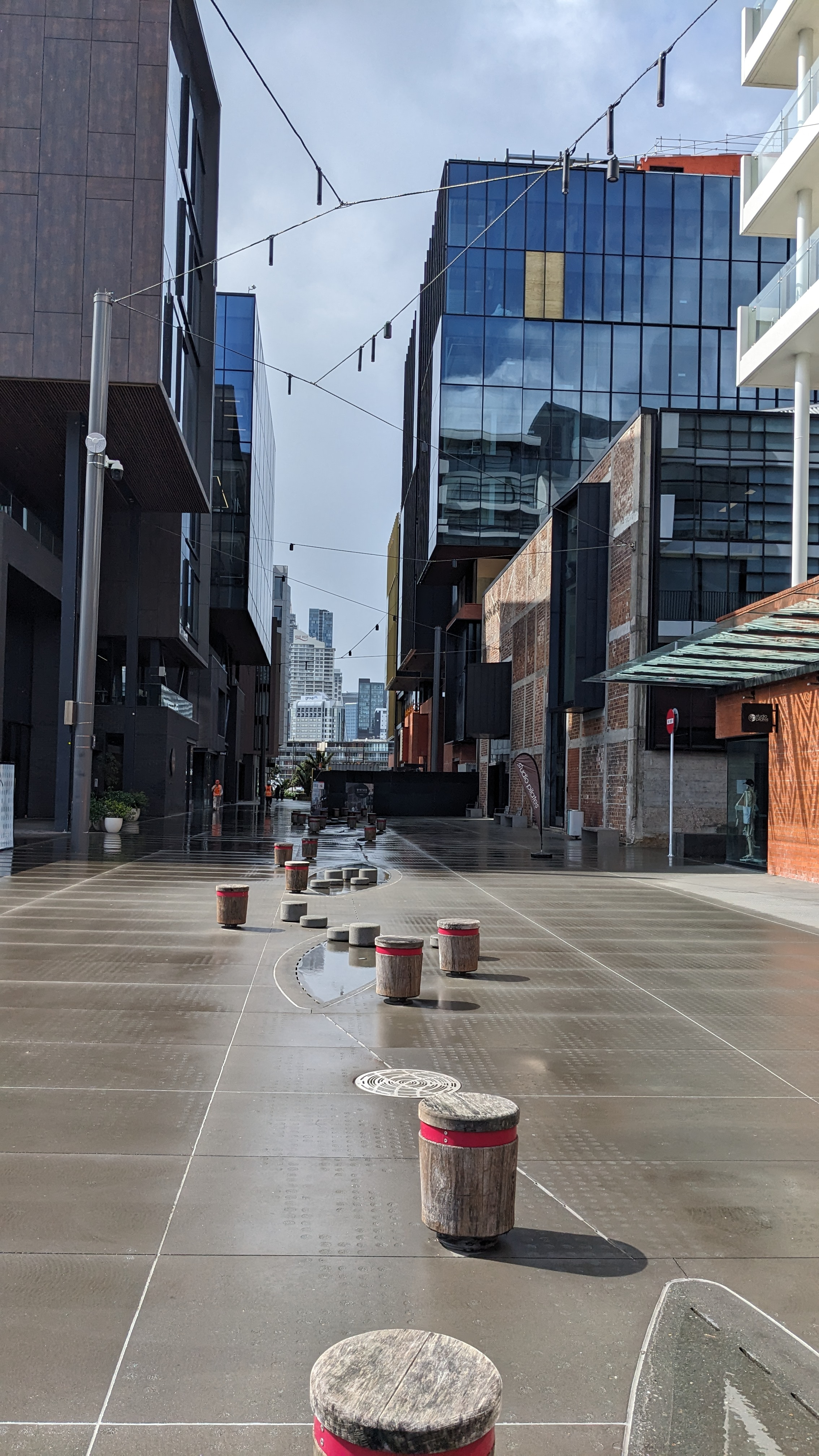
Tīramarama Way in Wynyard Quarter, design curated by Wraight and artist Lisa Reihana

Her Waitangi Park project in Wellington showcased sustainable landscape design, particularly water conservation, and her work on the Wynyard Quarter on Auckland's waterfront is an example of urban waterfront renewal. The Taranaki Wharf precinct in Wellington was a collaboration between Ian Athfield (architect), Graeme McIndoe, Chris McDonald, Stuart Niven (urban designers), Wraight and Penny Allen (landscape architects).

Wraight + Associates also designed Pukeahu National War Memorial Park in Wellington, and have won many awards from the New Zealand Institute of Landscape Architects, including four of the top awards in 2017.

=== Projects and awards ===
Some of Wraight + Associates' projects include:

- The development of Waitangi Park, Taranaki Wharf, CentrePort and the Lambton Harbour Masterplan on Wellington's Waterfront
- The Hood Street Upgrade, Hamilton
- Waitomo Caves Visitors' Centre, with Architecture Workshop
- Christchurch Coastal Pathway
- Wynyard Quarter, Jellicoe Street, North Wharf and Silo Park on Auckland's waterfront
- Pukeahu National War Memorial Park in Wellington, as Wraight Athfield Landscape + Architecture Ltd (WALA) (Category Winner, Parks category, NZILA awards 2017)
- Victoria University of Wellington Hub - Wraight + Associates Ltd with Athfield | Architectus (NZILA Award of Excellence, Institutional category, 2017)
- Cenotaph Precinct Upgrade, Wraight + Associates Ltd & Wellington City Council Urban Design Team (Category Winner, Urban spaces category, NZILA awards 2017)
- Redevelopment of Memorial Square in New Lynn in 1998.
