= The Boundary (shopping centre) =

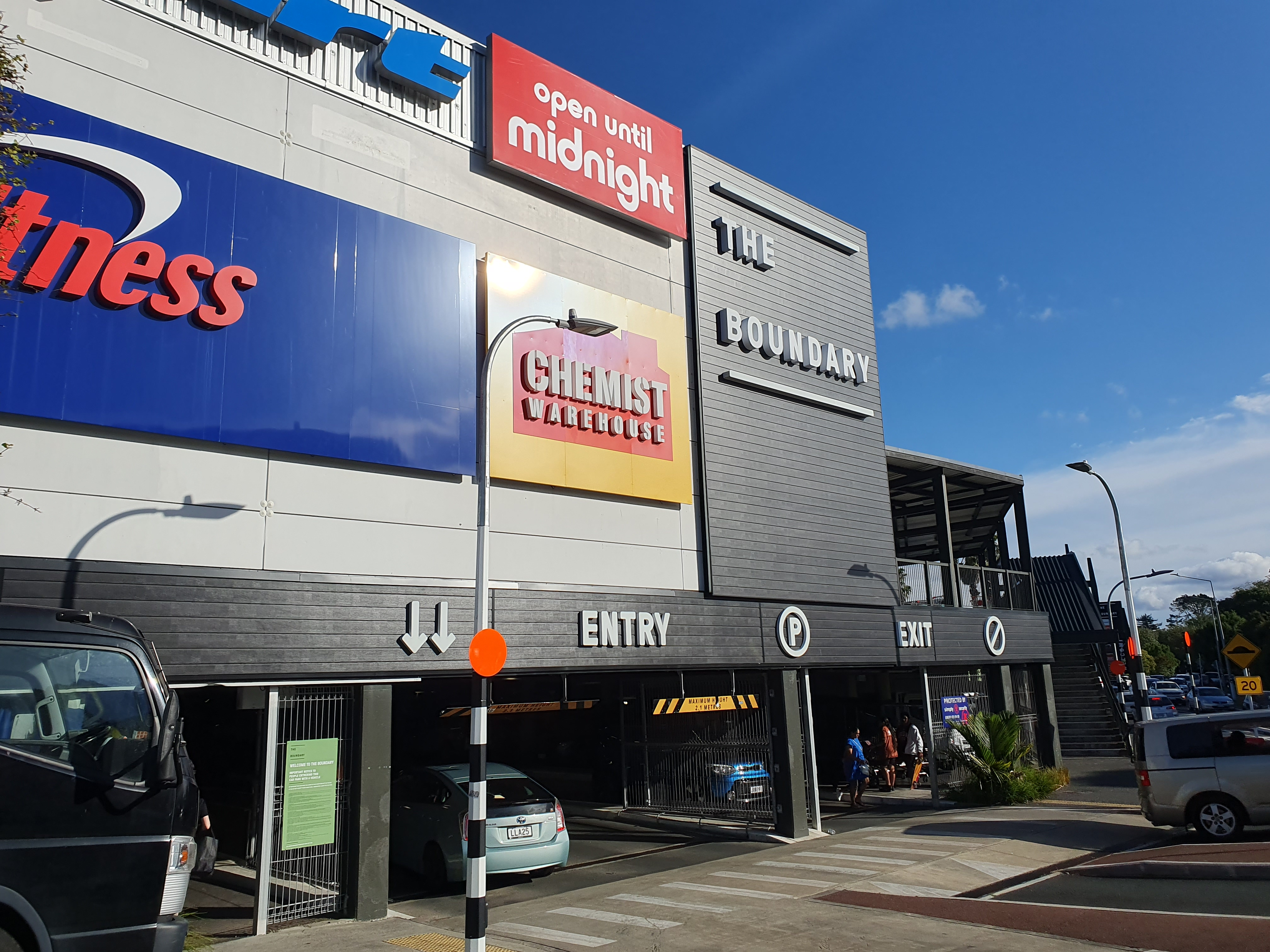
- Location: Henderson, Auckland
- Coordinates: 36°52′59″S 174°38′06″E
- Opened: 1980s
- Developer: Colliers International Real Estate Management
- Manager: Colliers International
- Num. of stores: 23
- Num. of anchor tenants: 3
- Floor area: 18,027 m^{2} (194,041 sq ft)
- Floors: 1
- Parking: 800+
- Website: The Boundary

The Boundary (formerly named Waitakere Mega Centre) is an integrated bulk retail shopping centre located in Henderson, a suburb in the west of Auckland, New Zealand. It is located on Vitasovich Avenue, approximately 15.7 kilometres (9.8 mi) west of the Auckland CBD, and is immediately adjacent to the WestCity Waitakere mall. The centre is configured in four freestanding blocks and draws from substantial undercroft parking facilities.

== History and development ==
In 1994, Wellington-based Waltus Investments acquired the site, then known as Waitakere Plaza, which contained Kmart, Foodtown, four specialty stores and a food court. In April 1997, Waltus committed to a NZD $5.2 million expansion and refurbishment of the centre, with the intention of turning it into a niche bulk retailing centre. The development, funded by bank loans, was based on the needs of the two new anchor tenants, Briscoes and Rebel Sport, who had just signed nine-year leases. The work was completed in 1998.

In November 2004, Urbus Properties, an NZSX-listed property company formed from the Waltus syndicate in May 2001, commenced a $14.5 million refurbishment, and renamed the site Waitakere Mega Centre. The impetus came from the departure of anchor tenant Foodtown, who had complained that the centre could not compete with the adjacent Westfield WestCity (later rebranded as WestCity Waitakere). The redevelopment, which took place over 2005 and 2006, saw the centre modified to a U-shaped design with the shops facing onto car parking, in line with other centres at Mount Wellington and Albany. The original 6,733 m^{2} (72,473 sq ft) Kmart store was demolished and replaced with 153 car parking bays, and Kmart moved into a 4,926 m^{2} (53,023 sq ft) new-format premises. An additional 6,229 m^{2} (67,048 sq ft) of retail space was added in the expansion. On 24 June 2005, ING acquired Urbus Properties, becoming New Zealand's second-largest listed property vehicle.

As at 31 January 2007, the centre was valued at $39,991,000 NZD. Waitakere Mega Centre was sold in 2014 for $45.75 million to a Christchurch-based investor. In 2017, it was rebranded as The Boundary.

== Transport ==
The centre is accessible via the nearby Henderson railway station and by bus services from Britomart Transport Centre and New Lynn railway station.

== See also ==
- List of shopping centres in New Zealand
