= Briscoe Group =

New Zealand retail company

Briscoe Group Limited
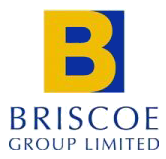
- Type: Public
- Traded as: NZX: BGP; S&P/NZX 50 component
- Industry: Retail (Homewares & Sports Equipment)
- Founded: Wolverhampton, England 1781; 245 years ago; Dunedin, New Zealand 1862; 164 years ago
- Headquarters: Auckland, New Zealand
- Number of locations: 91 stores (2025)
- Key people: Rod Duke, Group Managing Director
- Products: Briscoes Homeware; Rebel Sport
- Number of employees: 2,300
- Website: briscoegroup.co.nz

Briscoe Group Limited is a major New Zealand retail company operating 92 stores nationwide under the Briscoes Homeware (47 stores) and Rebel Sport (44 stores) brands. Established in Dunedin in 1861, the company originally supplied goods to gold miners during the Otago gold rush. Today, Briscoe Group employs around 2,300 staff and remains one of New Zealand's most prominent retail businesses, reporting a net profit of $88.4 million in 2022.

== History ==
In 1781, the predecessor of the modern company was founded in Wolverhampton, England. Initially a retailer of hardware, over the course of the 19th century it steadily expanded into the British colonies in Australia and New Zealand. The company was founded in 1861 in Dunedin, New Zealand, providing wares to gold miners. The first New Zealand-based Briscoes warehouse and shop was established in 1862 on the Dunedin corner of Princes and Jetty Streets. Its New Zealand business was initially aimed at supplying prospecting hardware (including shovels, picks, tents and lanterns) during the Otago gold rush.

By the beginning of World War I, Briscoes had offices in London, Sydney, Melbourne and throughout New Zealand. In addition to hardware and building supplies, the company also acted as an agent for skilled tradesmen, such as carpenters and masons, and also sold household items such as crockery and cutlery.

In 1973, Australian and New Zealand operations of Briscoes were purchased by Merbank Corporation of Australia. In 1977, Hagemeyer of The Netherlands purchased Briscoes New Zealand. In 1988, Hagemeyer recruited Rodney Adrian Duke as managing director of Briscoes. His mandate was to prepare the business for sale.

In 1988, when Rod Duke took over the business, it was bringing in $ 20 mln in sales, and had a $ 2 miln annual loss. It was selling products such as toys, hardware, and paint among others. Briscoes was bought by the RA Duke Trust, a trust established by Rodney Adrian Duke, in 1990.

Briscoes hired Brian Berry to oversee the expansion and renovation of the Briscoes retail stores in 1991.

Briscoes in 1995 negotiated a limited franchise agreement with Rebel Sport Australia, giving Briscoes exclusive rights to the Rebel Sport brand in New Zealand. Under the direction and guidance of Brian Berry, the first Rebel Sport store opened in Panmure, Auckland in 1996. The first Rebel Sport store outside of Auckland opened in 1997. In 1999, Briscoe made an agreement with Rebel Sport Australia for the franchise to be terminated with effect from April 2005, after which Briscoe would continue to have exclusive rights to the name in New Zealand.

The pandemic shutdowns resulted in around 3,500 store trading days being lost. According to the New Zealand Herald the company's profits were largely unaffected by the Covid-19 pandemic. Profit in 2022 was $ 88.4 mln. In 2023, online sales represented around 19% of group sales.

Head of the Briscoe Group, Rod Duke, in 2023 stated the company would slow store refurbishment plans during the economic downturn. Stuff.nz named Briscoe Group the fourth most powerful retail store in New Zealand in Jun. 2023. At the time it employed 2,300 staff in 90 stores. Rod Duke was managing director and largest shareholder, after taking over the business in 1988. Living & Giving stores closed in 2023.

== Nameplates ==
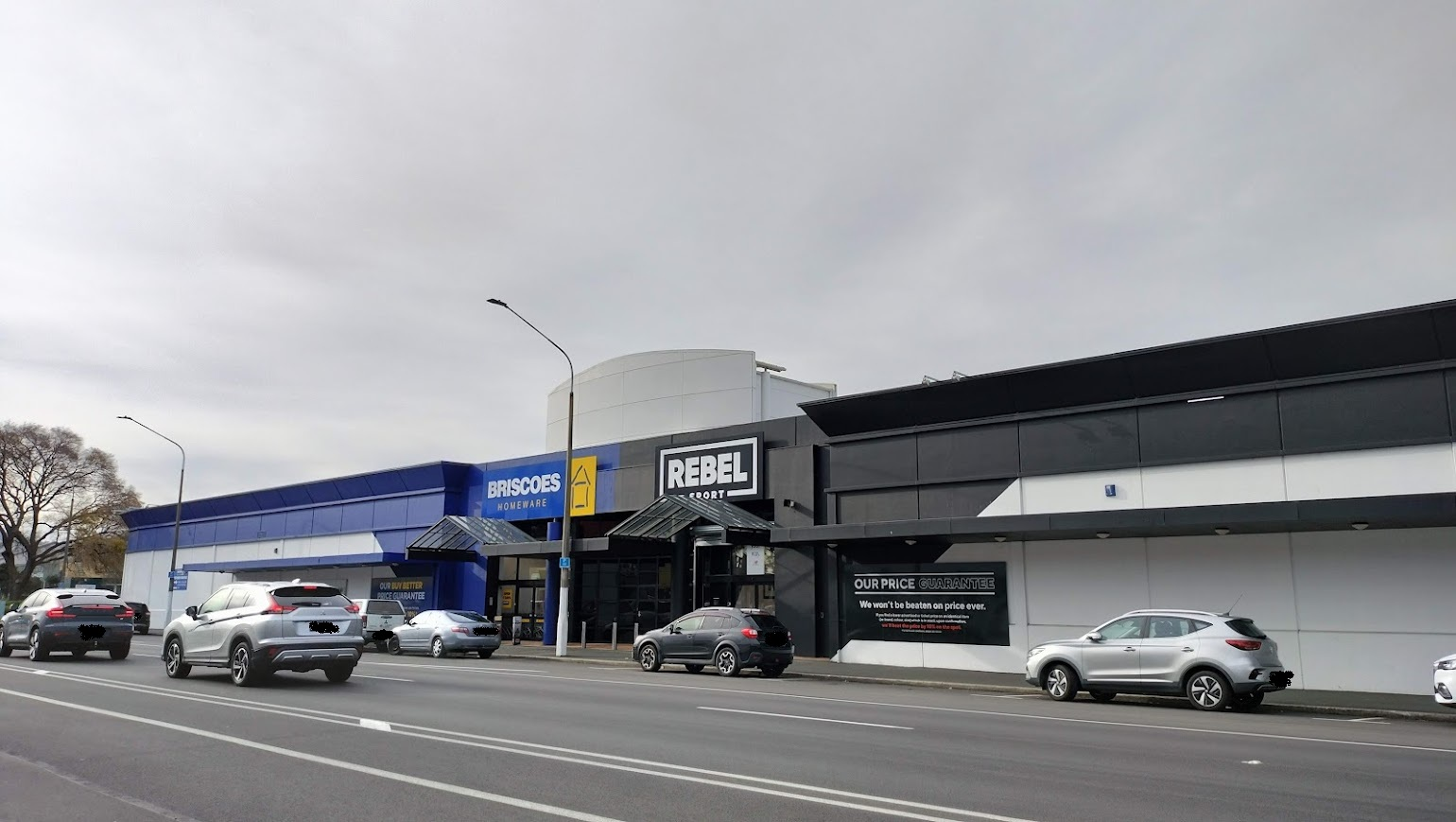
Briscoes Homeware and Rebel Sport stores on Crawford Street, Dunedin

=== Briscoes ===
Briscoes or Briscoes Homeware is a retail store selling a variety of homeware at sometimes heavily discounted prices. It is comparable in size to a medium size discount department store. Many brands are exclusively imported by Briscoes, allowing for such low prices. Briscoes Homeware is the flagship brand of the Group and generates most of the company's revenue. Currently there are 47 stores trading throughout New Zealand. The brand's slogan is "You'll never buy better", referring to Briscoes Homeware's 'Price Promise' that states the store will match and beat by 10% any price found on a stocked item at another retailer.

Tammy Wells, a farmer and former radio journalist from Canterbury, has fronted Briscoes' television advertising campaigns since 1989. She is known to New Zealanders as "The Briscoes Lady".

=== Rebel Sport New Zealand ===
Rebel Sport New Zealand is the largest sport equipment and apparel chain in New Zealand, with 44 stores currently trading. It was born out of a franchise agreement between Briscoe Group and Rebel Sport New Zealand in 1995. After successfully overseeing the expansion of the Briscoes Homeware stores from 12 to 22, then company director, Brian Berry, was given the task of overseeing the design and establishment of the Rebel Sport chain of stores in New Zealand. Briscoe has exclusive rights to the Rebel Sport name in New Zealand.

Like its sister nameplate Briscoes, Rebel Sport is comparable in size to a medium size discount department store. The chain does have a lowest price guarantee, although its unique duopoly position in the market allows it to stock a relatively high-end range while providing wider appeal through a calendar crammed with discount sale promotions.

In 2005, a deal collapsed between Briscoe Group and Lane Walker Rudkin (LWR), owners of Stirling Sports, which would have seen Briscoe buy Stirling Sports. Following this, LWR announced plans to launch several large-format stores across the country, beginning with a store in Christchurch, which it opened in mid-2006.

After Stirling's large-format launch, Rebel dropped their original slogan, "No one's got more sports gear", and replaced it with "Let's Play", beginning a new marketing campaign targeting a wider audience from their traditional club-orientated team sport audience. The company continued their aggressive expansion programme, launching several smaller-format stores such as Napier and Taupo to allow branches to reach further into provincial areas.

Briscoe Group previously owned the New Zealand naming rights to the Super Rugby rugby union competition, which was branded the Rebel Sport Super 14.
