= 2021 Dunedin supermarket stabbing =

Mass stabbing in Dunedin, NZ

- Location: Cumberland Street, Dunedin, New Zealand
- Date: 10 May 2021 shortly after 14:30 (NZST (UTC+12))
- Target: Shoppers and staff at the supermarket
- Attack type: Mass stabbing
- Weapon: Knives
- Deaths: 0
- Injuries: 5 (including the suspect)
- Perpetrator: Luke James Lambert
- Motive: Not definitively determined; the attacker may have been experiencing a psychotic episode

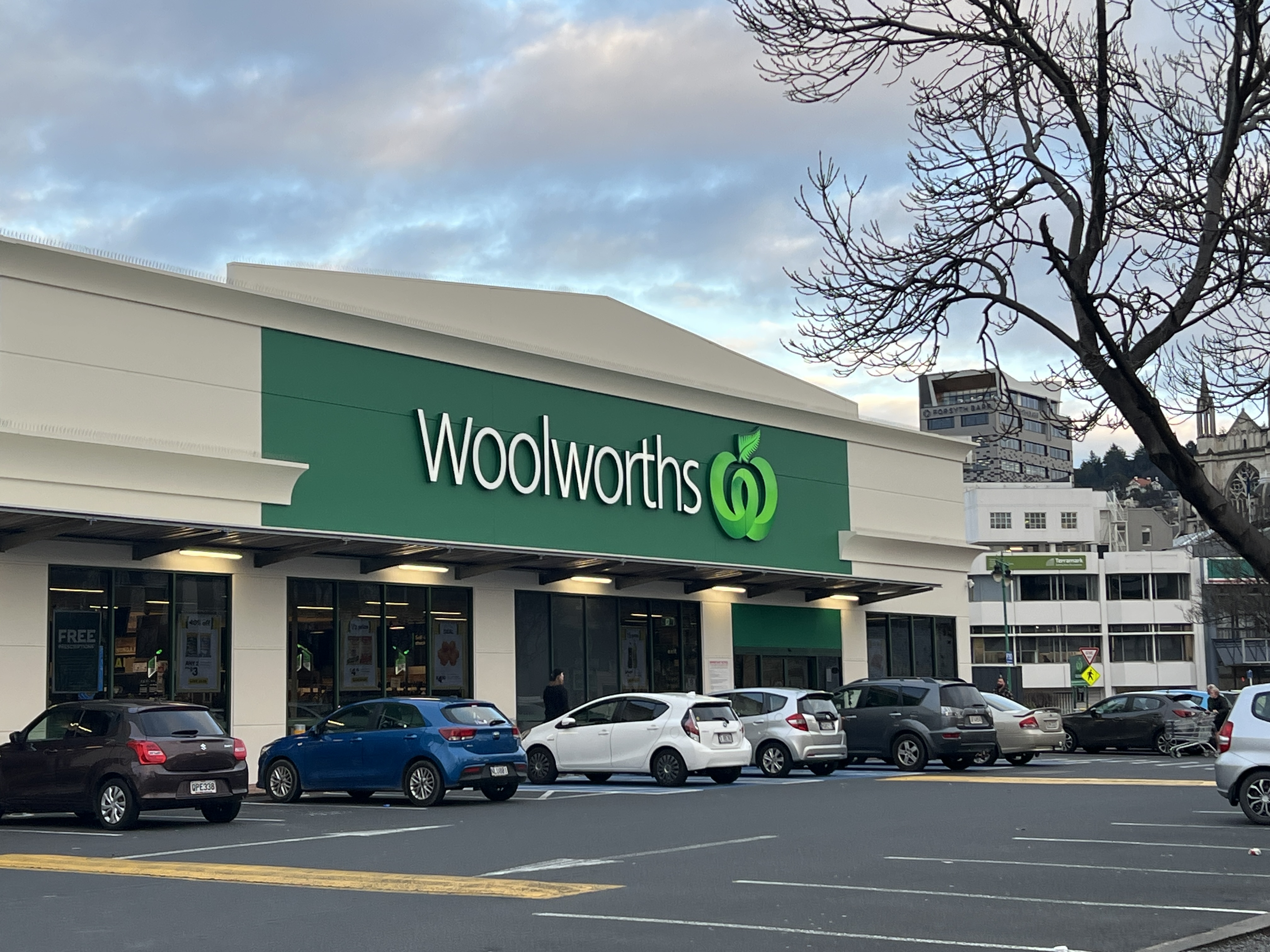
2021 Dunedin Countdown stabbing

On 10 May 2021, shortly after 14:30 NZST, four people were stabbed at the Countdown supermarket in central Dunedin, New Zealand. The victims were two shoppers and two staff members, reportedly in the area close to the supermarket pharmacy. The attacker stabbed four people in a rampage, seriously injuring three of them. All four stabbing victims were admitted to Dunedin Hospital, with three in the ICU; and was reported that all four remained in hospital, with three in serious but stable conditions.

The motive of the attack is as of yet unclear, but the alleged perpetrator was in an apparently deranged state of mind. In a press conference, Prime Minister Jacinda Ardern said there was no evidence the attack was an incident of domestic terrorism. She praised the people inside the supermarket who helped fend off the attacker as heroes. Police district commander Paul Basham also praised the actions of those who intervened in the attack, describing their actions as "nothing short of heroic".

A 42-year-old man was charged with attempted murder in relation to the stabbing. In early December 2021 the suspect, Luke James Lambert, pleaded guilty to four counts of attempted murder. In early May 2022, Lambert was sentenced to 13 years imprisonment on those attempted murder charges.

== Incident ==
At about 14:30 in the afternoon, the supermarket was relatively busy. A 42-year-old man, with an orange beard dressed in beige trousers and a Sons of Anarchy T-shirt, had entered either just before or some time previously. The following events were described as having happened extremely quickly. An eyewitness, Jenny McDowell, reported hearing screaming, before turning around and seeing a man stabbing one of the female staff members, possibly in the back. Another person inside the supermarket then heard the noise of someone, or some shelves, falling over. Another shopper heard screaming, and mistook it for his children, before turning around and seeing a woman who had been badly stabbed in the face. The man then turned and charged at customers, stabbing a man in the neck. University of Otago student Helena Rikiti said that staff from the Lotto and vegetable sections of the supermarket rushed over and then more people started screaming. It was then another shopper rushed past the checkout area, telling everyone to evacuate immediately.

Shoppers were quick to respond, pelting the attacker with various items to distract and confuse him. This worked, as he was restrained with some minor injuries. As people began to pin him down, the man began convulsing and screaming the words "witches, witches" repeatedly. They then managed to disarm him of several small knives he had used. McDowell later stated, "I just saw people from the public trying to restrain the man. There would've been about three or four people, he almost got loose again." She assisted in giving the male victim stabbed in his neck first aid, using her reusable shopping bag to apply pressure to his wounds. A supermarket worker also assisted the man using his jersey.

== Victims ==
The man stabbed in the neck was a Corrections officer, and his wife, a nurse, was stabbed in the back while trying to help him. The staff members who were stabbed were a woman, who received severe lacerations in her hands and arms, and a male manager at the supermarket. The mother of the latter supermarket employee said he was injured trying to stop the attack, and remained in hospital. One of the victims required CPR inside the supermarket and later testified during sentencing that he continues to experience lasting trauma and post-traumatic stress disorder.

== Suspect ==
The man who was taken into custody was described by the district commander for the Southern police district, as a "random" attacker. He was escorted off the premises about five to ten minutes after the attack had commenced. One witness claimed the man appeared to be having a psychotic episode, and another said the man was probably on drugs.

On 11 May, the police said a 42-year-old man had been charged with four counts of attempted murder in relation to the stabbing, and would appear in the Dunedin District Court later that day. He was granted interim name suppression and was remanded in custody until his next court appearance on 1 June.

On 8 December 2021, Luke James Lambert, 42, pleaded guilty to four charges of attempted murder in relation to the attack. On 3 May 2022, Lambert was sentenced to 13 years in prison with a non-parole period of 6½ years. Several victims including an unidentified female Countdown supermarket worker, Jorge Fuenzalida and Vanessa Miller-Andrews also gave victim impact statements during Lambert's sentencing. Fuenzalida and Miller-Andrews testified about their serious injuries and suffering post-traumatic stress disorder as a result of the attack.

Reports suggest that Lambert may have been experiencing a psychotic episode during the attack, though the court did not point to a definite motive.

== Reactions ==
Alongside assuring the public that the stabbings had apparently nothing to do with terrorism, Prime Minister Jacinda Ardern said in a press conference that "Needless to say that such an attack is hugely concerning, and I do want to acknowledge the really early reports of courageous acts by bystanders who have taken action in order to protect those around them," Ardern said. "Our thoughts are with all those affected by this attack." Countdown released a statement, saying "We are shocked and devastated by the events in our Dunedin Central Store this afternoon...Our priority right now is our injured team members and caring for our wider team in the wake of this extremely traumatic event. We are deeply upset that customers who tried to help our team members were also injured."

Countdown staff union's retail and finance secretary, Tali Williams says that although there is ongoing discussion about security it is 'hard to know what can stop somebody like that in that situation'.

== See also ==
- 2021 Auckland supermarket stabbing
- Aramoana massacre
- Christchurch mosque shootings
- Bondi Junction Stabbings
