= Lincraft =

Australian homewares store chain

Lincraft Australia Pty. Ltd.
- Industry: Retail
- Founded: 1938; 88 years ago
- Founder: John Maguire and Brian Swersky
- Headquarters: Melbourne, Victoria
- Number of locations: (2026)
- Area served: Australia, New Zealand
- Key people: Brian Swersky and John Maguire Joint Managing Directors
- Products: Fabrics, Crafts, Homewares
- Owner: John Maguire and Brian Swersky
- Website: http://www.lincraft.com.au/

Lincraft is a retail chain in Australia that specialises in the sale of homewares, including crafts, material, and patterns. As of February 2026, it had 29 stores in Australia and six stores in New Zealand. Following massive store closures over the years and a controversial sale strategy, the company announced in June 2026 that it would close all its physical stores.

== History ==
Lincraft (formerly Suzanne Silks) was nurtured by three generations of the Ross family before current owners John Maguire and Brian Swersky established Lincraft Australia in 2005. Lincraft was founded in 1938 by Leo Ross as a stall shop in Melbourne. In 2005, Lincraft fell into receivership, with ANZ Bank appointing KordaMentha, due to a slump in Christmas sales.

In 2010, the Australian Competition & Consumer Commission (ACCC) reported that Lincraft had sold imported bathrobes which failed to meet safety and labelling standards, but that they accepted Lincraft's efforts to prevent similar occurrences in the future.

In 2016, the company cut down and adjusted its range as it adjusted to changing tastes and a hostile market. It did not disclose any financial information which may have resulted in its decision. It also closed down some stores at the same time.

Around 2024, it began to close down several more regional stores. This drew some confusion and ire from consumers as the inflammatory "Stock Liquidation Sale" used on the surviving stores gave the impression that Lincraft was again going out of business as with similar businesses at the time, and may have breached New Zealand consumer law by misrepresenting the manner it is clearing the stock.

In June 2026, Lincraft announced it would progressively close all remaining physical stores, maintaining an online presence. At the time of its closure, Lincraft had 30 stores across eastern Australia and New Zealand. These closures are expected to affect about 300 jobs.
