= 2021 Auckland supermarket stabbing =

Terrorist attack in Auckland, New Zealand

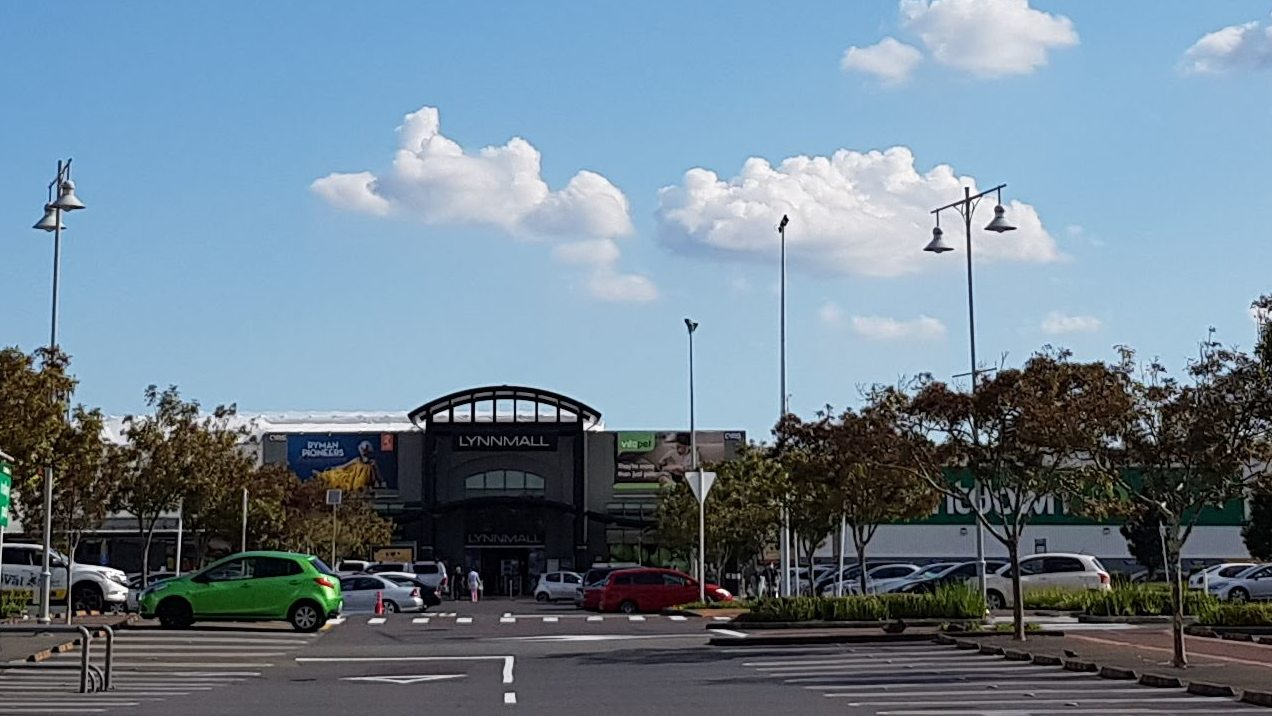
- LynnMall shopping centre in March 2020. The Countdown supermarket can be seen to the right, behind the trees.
- Location: 36°54′26.3″S 174°41′3.8″E; New Lynn, West Auckland, New Zealand
- Date: 3 September 2021; 14:40 (NZST; UTC+12)
- Target: Shoppers at the supermarket
- Attack type: Mass stabbing
- Weapon: Knife
- Deaths: 1 (the perpetrator)
- Injuries: 8
- Perpetrator: Ahamed Aathill Mohamed Samsudeen
- Motive: Islamic extremism

On 3 September 2021 at 14:40 NZST, eight people were injured in a mass stabbing at a Countdown supermarket at LynnMall in New Lynn, Auckland, New Zealand. The attacker, Ahamed Samsudeen, was being followed by police officers, who intervened during the attack, shooting and killing him after he charged at them. He was pronounced dead at the scene.

The incident was treated as terrorism and was "ISIS-inspired" according to Prime Minister Jacinda Ardern. It was the second stabbing in less than four months to occur at a Countdown supermarket, the first being in Dunedin, and the first terrorist attack in New Zealand since the Christchurch mosque shootings in 2019.

== Background ==
At the time of the incident, the Auckland region was under strict alert level 4 lockdown due to an outbreak of the COVID-19 Delta variant in the city on 17 August 2021. Supermarkets were one of the few businesses allowed to open at this alert level. In addition, supermarkets were limiting the number of people in the store at one time to ensure social distancing.

Terrorism in New Zealand has been relatively uncommon. The last incident, the Christchurch mosque shootings, was carried out in March 2019, where two mosques were attacked during Friday prayers. A subsequent royal commission found that New Zealand's terrorism legislation was inadequate, and Parliament was already debating amendments to the legislation.

== Incident ==
The attacker was trailed by a police surveillance team together with a separate tactical team from the Special Tactics Group when he left his home in Glen Eden and travelled by train to the Countdown supermarket at LynnMall. The surveillance team had difficulty closely following the man in the supermarket due to the man's paranoia of being followed and social distancing restrictions. He proceeded to shop in the supermarket for 10 minutes without suspicion before the attack.

He used a knife from a shelf in the supermarket to carry out the attack. At least one video of the attack was posted to social media showing shoppers warning others and some attempting to intervene.

Two Special Tactics Group officers following him were alerted to the attack 60–90 seconds after it started, and shot the attacker 60 seconds later after he refused to surrender, killing him. He was shot after he ran at them with his knife raised.

== Victims ==
Eight people were injured in the attack. Six victims were taken to hospital, five with stab wounds and one with a dislocated shoulder. Auckland City Hospital received three in critical condition and one in a serious condition. Waitakere Hospital and Middlemore Hospital each received one patient in a moderate condition. One victim received minor injury and self-treated at home. An eighth victim was reported by police on 14 September 2021. There were four female victims aged 29, 43, 60 and 66; and three male victims aged 53, 57 and 77. As of 14 September 2021, five of the victims were recovering at home, while three remained in stable condition at Auckland Hospital.

== Attacker ==
Samsudeen appearing at a court in 2018

The perpetrator was identified as Ahamed Aathill Mohamed Samsudeen (1988/1989 – 3 September 2021) a 32-year-old Sri Lankan Moor national who arrived in New Zealand in October 2011. Samsudeen, who had a long history of mental health problems and sympathy towards the Islamic State, was shot and killed by the police during the attack.

Samsudeen was born in Kattankudy, Sri Lanka, a Muslim-majority town which has had issues with radicalisation in recent years. The youngest child in a family of four children, he received his secondary education at Colombo Hindu College which in Bambalapitiya, Colombo before arriving in New Zealand in 2011 on a student visa.

Samsudeen sought refugee status as a Tamil Muslim, alleging that he and his father had issues with Sri Lankan authorities because of their political background. His original claim to refugee status was declined in 2012.

In 2013 the Immigration and Protection Tribunal said that Samsudeen was "persistently re-experiencing traumatic events" and concluded he had a well-founded fear of facing harm if he returned to Sri Lanka. He was subsequently granted refugee status. His claim to asylum was supported by scars on his body, as well as a psychologist's report which said Samsudeen presented as a "highly distressed and damaged young man" suffering from post-traumatic stress disorder and depression. While investigating him years later, Immigration NZ was made aware of information that led them to believe his refugee status was fraudulently obtained.

According to his mother living in Sri Lanka, Samsudeen was radicalised in New Zealand. She blamed his neighbours from Iraq and Syria for exposing him to radical views. On 23 March 2016, Samsudeen came to the attention of New Zealand police after posting photos of horrific acts of war brutality on his Facebook page, along with remarks praising the Islamic State terrorist strikes in Brussels the day prior, hence being considered a supporter of ISIS. Samsudeen was deemed a public safety danger after purchasing large hunting knives on two occasions and owning Islamic State videos.

On 29 April and 25 May 2016, police formally warned Samsudeen about posting objectionable material on the web. He apologised and deleted his social media account.

Samsudeen continued to engage in online activities. On 19 May 2017, Samsudeen booked flights for his family to Kuala Lumpur, and for himself to Singapore via Kuala Lumpur. All were for the next day. Police arrested Samsudeen at Auckland Airport on the evening of 20 May, Samsudeen had told a worshipper at an Auckland Mosque he wanted to go to Syria "to fight for ISIS", and he was held in custody without bail. He subsequently pled guilty to charges of distributing restricted material.

After his arrest, police executed a search warrant at Samsudeen's flat. The search found Samsudeen had a large hunting knife under a mattress on the floor, and digital storage media which contained fundamentalist material, including propaganda videos, and photographs of Samsudeen posing with a firearm and digital bookmarks to sales of firearms, crossbows, binoculars, military boots and a vest. He was charged with having these goods, and pled guilty to counts of intentionally distributing restricted publications, fraud, and failing to cooperate with authorities in the execution of their search warrants. He was granted bail.

In August 2018, Samsudeen bought a knife while on bail and was arrested again. Another search turned up extremist content, including an Islamic State film showing a masked man slitting a prisoner's throat and wrists in order to kill a "non-believer". He also faced allegations of possessing objectionable material, possessing an offensive weapon, and failing to cooperate with authorities in the exercise of search warrants.

After spending three years in prison, he was released into the community in July 2021. In May 2021, he had been convicted of possessing propaganda-style material supportive of ISIS and was sentenced to one year of supervision. After release from prison, he was being watched by police and the New Zealand Security Intelligence Service, with up to 30 police monitoring him. At the time of the attack he was still facing charges for assaulting prison officers while in custody.

=== Court cases ===
In September 2018, Samsudeen was sentenced to 12 months supervision in relation to the first set of charges, but remained in prison due to additional offences he committed and subsequent charges while on bail.

In July 2020, Samsudeen remained in custody awaiting trial, and the Crown attempted to add an additional charge for the knife and internet posts under the current Terrorism Suppression Act. The High Court denied this, stating that they were bound by law, Justice Downs said it was not for the courts to create such an offence, further saying "The absence of an offence of planning or preparing a terrorist act ... could be an Achilles' heel."

In May 2021, Samsudeen was found guilty in the High Court of possessing undesirable publications, knowing and neglecting to help the police in carrying out their search warrants. He was found not guilty of another charge of having unpleasant material in his possession, as well as the accusation of having a weapon in a public place.

On 6 July 2021, Samsudeen was sentenced to 12 months of supervision by a High Court judge due to the length of time he had previously spent in custody. There were some additional requirements, such as showing his probation officials all of his personal devices and giving them access to his social media accounts. He also had to go through a rehabilitation evaluation and treatment. The Crown wanted him to be monitored by GPS, but that wasn't imposed by the court. He then applied for bail on the charges of assaulting the Corrections officers. A pre-sentence report submitted to the court noted that Samsudeen "had the means and motivation to commit violence in the community" and his risk of reoffending was also considered high. On 16 July 2021, Samsudeen was released on bail by an Auckland District Court judge and was to be monitored by the Special Tactics Group. The Department of Corrections turned down an offer by the New Zealand Muslim Association (NZMA) to help rehabilitate Samsudeen following his release, due to his unwillingness to engage with religious and cultural support. The NZMA expressed concern that Corrections had elected to house Samsudeen at Glen Eden's Masjid e Bilal, whose resources were limited compared to the NZMA.

== Responses ==
=== Political ===
Prime Minister Jacinda Ardern and Police Commissioner Andrew Coster held a media briefing at 17:15 on the day of the attack. Auckland Mayor Phil Goff vented frustration that the Prime Minister could not share information about the terrorist to the public due to court-issued suppression orders. He also said it is even harder to deal with this attack while the city is under alert level 4 lockdown.

The Sri Lankan government began its own investigation and offered to cooperate with New Zealand authorities.

On 30 September, the New Zealand House of Representatives passed the Counter-Terrorism Legislation Act 2021, which criminalised the planning of terror attacks and expanded the powers of police to conduct warrantless searches. The counter-terrorism bill was supported by the governing Labour and opposition National parties but was opposed by the Green, ACT and Māori parties.

=== Societal ===
The Federation of Islamic Associations of New Zealand condemned the attack, stating that "terrorists who do such inhumane and vile acts do not belong to any religion... They act out of sheer hate, and they have no place in our country." It also expressed sympathy for the victims and their families as well as bystanders who had witnessed the terror attack.

Samsudeen's family condemned his actions and expressed their love and support for the victims. Sri Lanka's Muslim Council also condemned the attack, calling it a barbaric act of terrorism.

=== Supermarkets ===
Countdown as well as Foodstuffs, which together own the vast majority of supermarkets in New Zealand, removed all sharp knives from sale nationwide as a precautionary measure.

=== Judicial ===
The incident has been referred to the Independent Police Conduct Authority and to the coroner for investigation.

==== Coronial inquest first phase ====
On 3 June 2025, a coronial inquest into the death of Ahamed Samsudeen began with legal arguments followed by evidence by eyewitnesses and experts. On 4 June, Coroner Marcus Elliot opened the first phase of the inquest by acknowledging the victims, members of the public who confronted Samsudeen and the responding police officers. Two survivors also detailed their ongoing physical and psychological injuries. CCTV footage of Samsudeen's attack was played in court. Detective senior sergeant Jason McIntosh also told the court that Samsudeen had accessed a website and searched for objectionable content encouraging violence and terrorism. Auckland Crown Solicitor Alysha McClintock also questioned McIntosh on why STG officers did not follow Samsudeen into the supermarket that day.

On 5 June, the coroner's counsel Anna Adams read Samsudeen's threat assessment dating back to 5 August 2021. McIntosh also detailed Samsudeen's criminal history including the possession of offensive weapons and objectionable material including a hunting knife, throwing star and an ISIS video depicting the mutilation of a captive. Adams also scrutinised the movements of Samsudeen and the responding officers during the stabbing attack. On 6 June, the inquest heard testimony from Michael Andrews and Ross Tomlinson, two civilians who had been awarded bravery medals for confronting Samsudeen during the 2021 attack. On 6 June, a senior police officer told the coronial inquest that Samsudeen was likely to commit an attack before an immigration hearing.

On 10 June, forensic pathologist Dr Kilak Kesha told the coronial hearing that Samsudeen was unlikely to survive his gunshot injuries, which penetrated his heart, intestine, spleen and lungs. The pathologist concluded that Samsudeen died from exsanguination or blood loss. No drugs were found in his body. Detective senior sergeant Jason McIntosh was also questioned by Adams and lawyer Todd Simmons, the lawyer representing two of the police officers who shot Samsudeen. On 13 June, Fletcher Pilditch KC, the lawyer representing Samsudeen's family, said that early intervention could have prevented the Countdown terror attack and Samsudeen's death. Following two weeks of hearings, the first phase of the coronial inquest into Samsudeen's death concluded that day. The Coroner is expected to issue a ruling on the circumstances of his death. Two more hearings are expected to be held later in the year.

==== Coronial inquest second phase ====
The second and third phases of the coronial inquests commenced on 13 July 2026, focusing on the factors which contributed to Samsudeen's radicalisation and his attitudes towards women. During the first day, a probation officer told the inquest that Samsudeen had initially been cooperative at the start of his incarceration but had become violent and uncooperative towards the end of his incarceration. During the second day, Samsudeen's former mentor testified about his embrace of radical Islamic ideas and beliefs. Forensic psychiatrist Dr Justin Barry-Walsh also told the coroner that Samsudeen posed a threat to women, citing his behaviour towards his lawyer. Forensic psychiatrist Dr Ian Goodwin also testified about Samsudeen's stalking and harassment behaviours before the 2021 stabbing incident. He said that he believed that police orders stopping the defendant from stalking his female lawyer and a police officer triggered the defendant's stabbing attack. On 17 July, Samsudeen's former flatmate told the coroner about his sympathies for ISIS, which included watching ISIS recruitment and fighting videos, and praising ISIS attacks as victories.

== Aftermath ==
On the evening of the stabbing, the Crown Solicitor applied to the High Court to lift the suppression order concerning the attacker, which was issued in July 2018. The High Court ruled it would allow publication as there was no longer a proper basis for it, but delayed this for 24 hours to give the attacker's family time to be contacted and his lawyers time to give instructions and seek a new name suppression order if they wished.

A North Shore teenager who had already been planning an Islamic terror attack felt inspired by the supermarket stabbing and intended to execute his plan earlier. He was arrested on 8 September, with police finding bomb-making ingredients in his home.

== See also ==
- 2021 Dunedin supermarket stabbing
- 2023 Auckland Shooting
- 2024 Bondi Junction Stabbings
