= Smiths City =

New Zealand furniture company

- The Smiths City logo used since 2020
- Formerly: City Market (1918–1938); Smiths City Market (1938–1988)
- Industry: Retail
- Founded: 1918; 108 years ago in Christchurch, New Zealand
- Founder: Henry Cooper Smith
- Defunct: 2025
- Fate: Voluntary administration
- Headquarters: Christchurch, New Zealand
- Area served: New Zealand
- Key people: Colin Neal (owner)
- Products: Furniture, home appliances, consumer electronics
- Parent: Polar Capital Limited
- Subsidiaries: Smiths City Commercial; Smiths City Finance
- Website: smithscity.co.nz

Smiths City was a New Zealand retail chain selling furniture and home appliances. It was originally founded by Henry Cooper Smith in 1918 as City Market initially involved with auctioning grain and product. On Tuesday 2 September 2025 Smiths City was placed into voluntary administration. On 1 October, creditors voted the company into liquidation.

In 2026, owner Colin Neal was personally declared bankrupt with at least $1 million in unresolved debt.

== History ==
=== Early history ===
In 1918, Henry Cooper Smith established City Market on Colombo Street in Christchurch. The business initially auctioned grain, livestock and general goods, but later began to specialize in new and used furniture and hardware. The business eventually became Smith's City Market, or Smiths City. The flagship Colombo Street store was still operating more than 100 years later, in 2020.

Smiths City opened its first store outside Christchurch, in Filleul Street, Dunedin, in 1977. By March 2020, it had 29 stores.

In 1983, Smiths City purchased 80% of Noel Leeming Television Limited. Following the company being placed into receivership in 1991, the receivers sold both the North Island division and Noel Leeming Television Limited.

In 2004, Smiths City purchased 80% of local Wellington retailer LV Martin & Son. LV Martin & Son was founded in 1934 as a Wellington household appliance store. LV Martin & Son merged with Smiths City at the end of 2015 with all stores now displaying the Smiths City branding.

=== COVID-19 pandemic ===
Smiths City was placed into a trading halt on 27 March 2020, two days into New Zealand's COVID-19 lockdown, after it was initially denied permission to operate as an essential business. It held talks with its primary lender ASB Bank, and the bank agreed to delay a debt repayment. However, the company's share price plunged when the trading halt ended on the following trading day, 30 March.

The company's Blenheim store, the largest tenant of Marlborough District Council, was given a rent discount during the lockdown. Within the first week of the lockdown, the company was also given permission to sell essential goods online.

In May 2020, Smiths City undertook a major restructure due to the ongoing impact of the virus. The board voted to go into receivership to fast-track a potential sale without time-consuming shareholder approval. It laid off 115 workers, about a quarter of its national workforce. It also closed seven of its 29 stores.

The chain's remaining stores were sold to new owners later the same month. The sale took place over Zoom, without the buyer being able to visit any physical stores.

=== 2020 relaunch ===
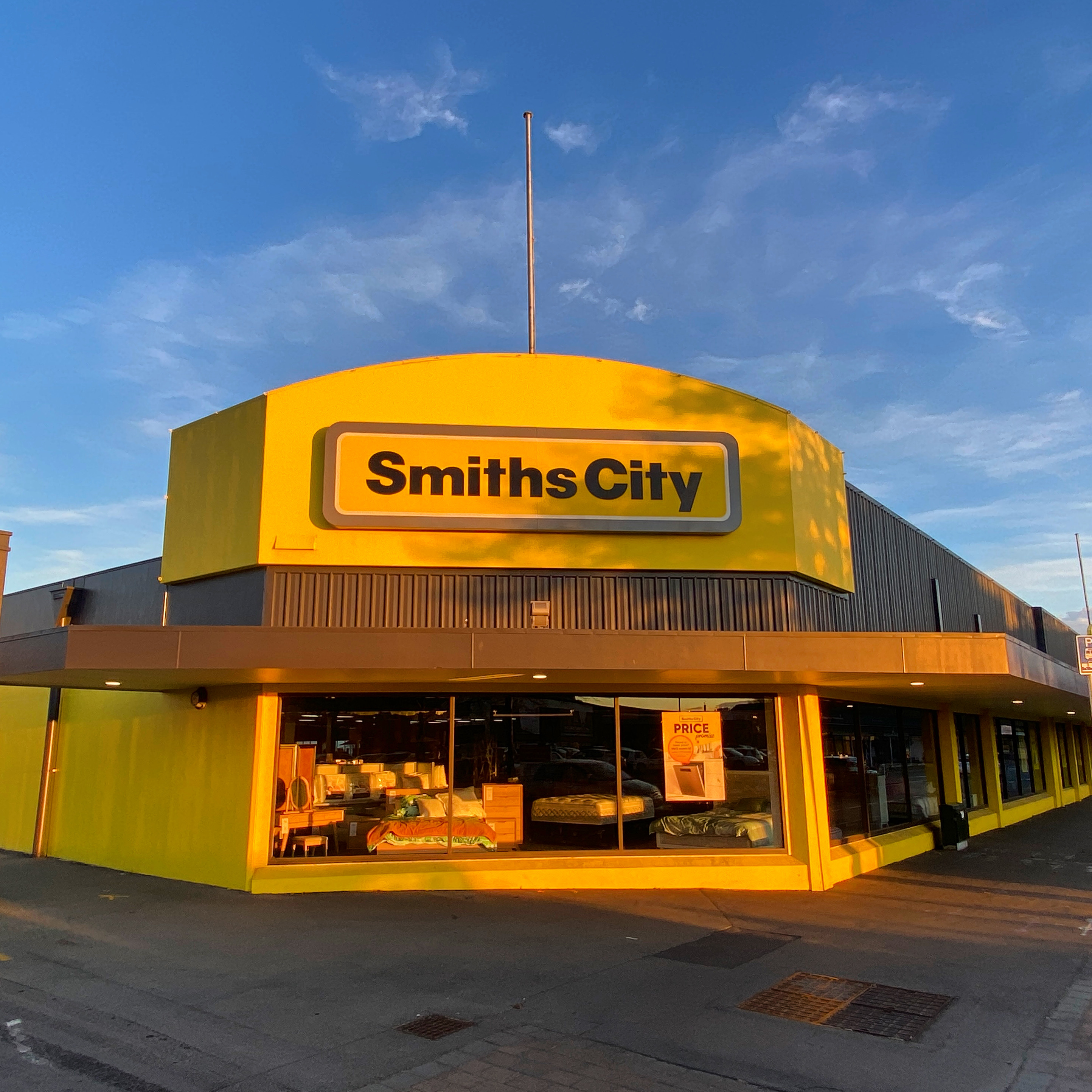
Smiths City store in Christchurch, 2020

The new owners closed Smiths City's operations in Auckland, where it had struggled against Australian rival chains like Harvey Norman and Freedom Furniture.

In June 2020, Smiths City opened its first new store after going into receivership in Petone. The store is the only store in the Wellington region following the closures of the previous three branches; Lower Hutt, Porirua and Kapiti.

In July 2020, Smiths City opened a new flagship store at The Colombo Shopping Centre in Sydenham. The original flagship store, on nearby Colombo Street, remained open.

In August 2020, Smiths City moved its Dunedin store from Andersons Bay Road in South Dunedin, where it had been for 14 years, to the Meridian Mall in the city's CBD, where Kmart had moved out after 23 years.

By October 2020, the company had returned to profit, had recruited more staff, and had plans to open another five stores.

The store at The Colombo in Christchurch was rebranded to Smiths Trade Outlet in July 2023.

=== Demise ===
Smiths City started downsizing its store numbers in 2025 in an attempt to recover profit.

However, on Tuesday 2 September 2025 Smiths City was placed into voluntary administration, with BDO reappointed administrators. Administrators Colin Gower and Diana Matchett of BDO Christchurch said "The company has faced increasing financial pressures in a challenging economic environment".

Stores immediately closed while an urgent stocktake and examination took place, then surviving stores opened for a liquidation sale to liquidate remaining inventory. The last stores closed on Sunday 14 September, with some closing earlier or never opening.

On 1 October, creditors voted the company into liquidation, with no other viable option except to return it to the sole-owner-director who earlier took back operations in an attempt to stem losses. Debt estimates were at $26 million, with $10 million owed to secured creditors. Several other creditors are expected not to receive anything.

The High Court of New Zealand declared owner-director Colin Neal bankrupt after incurring at least a $1 million debt from unpaid rent and restoration costs at the Tower Rail Precinct, Hornby and not responding to the debt. A New World operator also was filing a bankruptcy order on Neal after also being ignored.

=== Smiths City 2026 Relaunch ===
Smiths City 2026 Limited was incorporated on 23 February 2026, with Ric Sheehan and Michael Bell listed as directors according to New Zealand Companies Office records. The relaunch was confirmed in a joint statement issued with liquidators BDO Christchurch on 31 July 2026.

BDO Christchurch partner Colin Gower, who had been appointed administrator and later liquidator alongside Diana Matchett, said BDO had aimed to secure an outcome giving the brand a genuine chance at a future, and the new owners in turn credited BDO with managing a difficult process professionally.

The new owners described the purchase in personal terms, saying they wanted to show their children what could be achieved by committing to a project, and framed the acquisition as taking on responsibility for a century-old brand's legacy rather than simply buying a business.
