= Noel Leeming =

New Zealand consumer electronics and appliances retailer

- Current logo, introduced in 2014
- Formerly: Noel Leeming Television
- Type: Subsidiary
- Founded: 1973; 53 years ago in Christchurch
- Founder: Noel Victor Leeming
- Number of locations: 73 stores and collection centres (as of April 2026)
- Parent: The Warehouse Group
- Website: www.noelleeming.co.nz

Noel Leeming is a New Zealand retail chain specialising in consumer electronics and home appliances. It was founded in Christchurch in 1973 as Noel Leeming Television and has since grown into a nationwide retailer. The company has been a subsidiary of The Warehouse Group since 2012. The brand’s current visual identity dates from a 2014 refresh.

== History ==
The company’s first store opened in 1973 at Barrington Park Mall in Christchurch under the name Noel Leeming Television. It expanded throughout the South Island before opening its first North Island branch in Auckland in 1986. Founder Noel Leeming retired as managing director in 1992.

In 1996, Noel Leeming merged with Bond & Bond under the Pacific Retail Group, which operated about 90 branches nationwide. In 2004, Australian private-equity firm Gresham Private Equity acquired Pacific Retail Group and rebranded it Noel Leeming Group.

The Warehouse Group purchased Noel Leeming Group in December 2012 for NZ$65 million and retained it as a separate trading division. In 2011, the retailer launched its Tech Solutions division, offering technology setup, repair, and education services.

== Operations ==
Noel Leeming sells consumer electronics, whiteware, small appliances and related accessories. Its Tech Solutions service provides installation, repair and technical education for both individual and business customers.

As of September 2025, the company operates 73 stores and collection centres across New Zealand. The table below summarises the store distribution by region.

Region	Number of branches / centres
Auckland Region	15
Waikato / Bay of Plenty	10
Canterbury	9
Wellington Region	6
Otago / Southland	7
Hawke’s Bay / Manawatū / Taranaki	8
Tasman / Nelson / Marlborough	3
Northland / Gisborne / West Coast / regional centres	15

== Legal issues and controversies ==
Noel Leeming has been the subject of several actions by New Zealand’s Commerce Commission and other public scrutiny.

In 2018, the Commission prosecuted Noel Leeming Group for eight breaches of the Fair Trading Act 1986 relating to misleading representations about customers’ rights under the Consumer Guarantees Act. The company pleaded guilty and was fined NZ$200,000 in the District Court.

In 2019 an incident at Noel Leeming’s Blenheim store. According to media reports, a teenage employee claimed that Ronald Thompson — a man with a prior criminal history involving sexual offences — visited the store and made repeated inappropriate advances towards her. The employee said she felt threatened and uncomfortable and that management did not initially act to trespass him. Reports stated that police recommended the individual be barred from the premises, but Noel Leeming declined, saying he should be given “a second chance.”

In December 2020, the Commission issued a formal warning to Noel Leeming for making delivery representations without reasonable grounds during the COVID-19 lockdown and for accepting payments without reasonable belief that goods could be supplied on time.

In July 2025, the Commission filed criminal charges in the Auckland District Court alleging multiple breaches of the Fair Trading Act relating to Noel Leeming’s “Price Promise” promotion. The Commission stated that some advertised products and prices could not be obtained as represented. Noel Leeming indicated it would defend the charges.

== See also ==
- The Warehouse Group
- Christchurch
- Fair Trading Act 1986
- Commerce Commission
- Consumer Guarantees Act 1993
