= Countdown (supermarket) =

New Zealand supermarket chain

- Final logo, used from 2018 to 2023

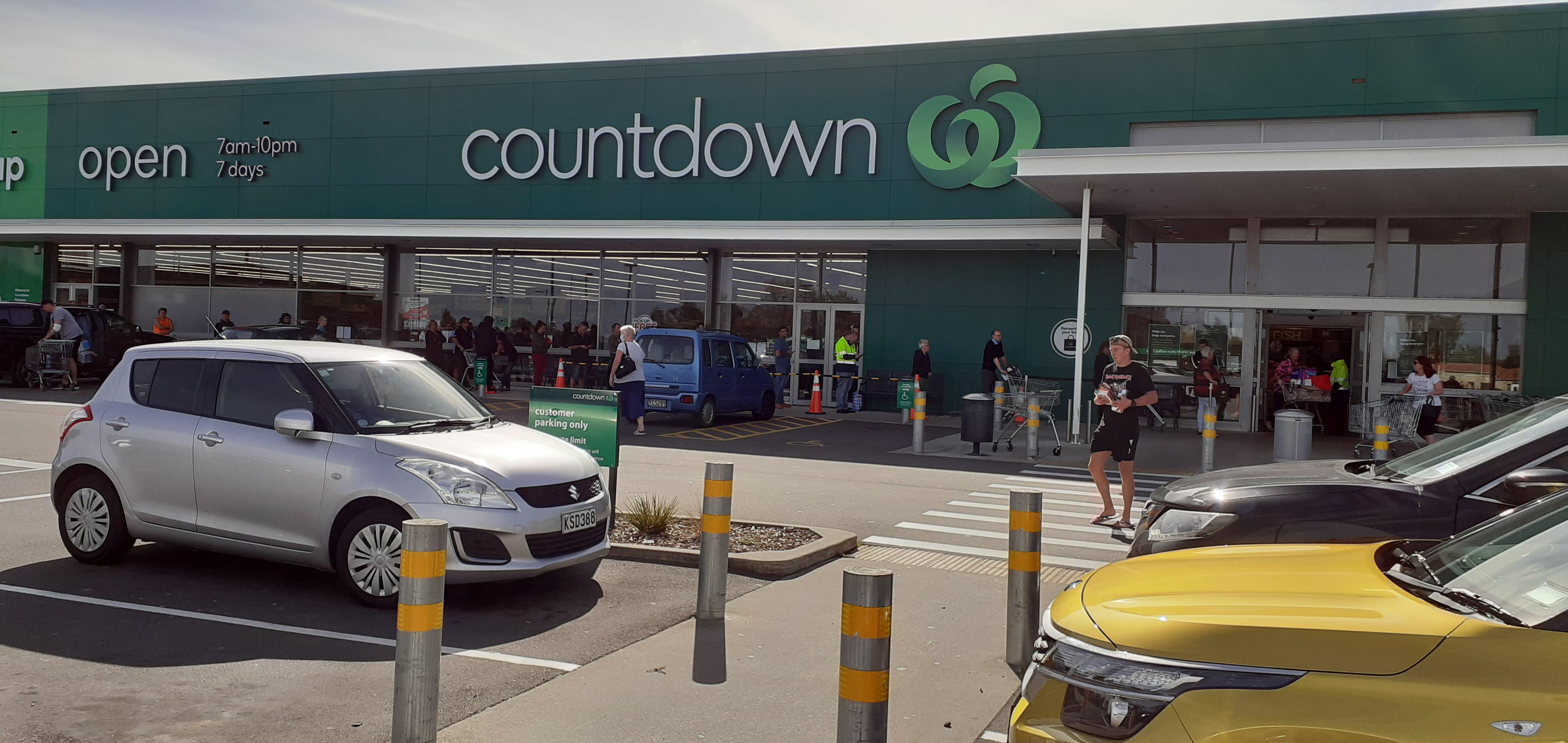
- Countdown supermarket in Rolleston prior to the rebranding to Woolworths
- Type: Subsidiary
- Industry: Retail
- Predecessor: Woolworths (New Zealand) (1929); Foodtown
- Founded: May 1981; 45 years ago
- Founder: Rattrays Wholesale
- Defunct: 2023; 3 years ago
- Successor: Woolworths (New Zealand) (2023)
- Headquarters: Auckland, New Zealand
- Area served: New Zealand
- Key people: Spencer Sonn (Managing Director)
- Products: Grocery stores; Supermarkets
- Number of employees: 18,000 +
- Parent: Woolworths (New Zealand)
- Website: countdown.co.nz

Countdown was an Australian-owned New Zealand full-service supermarket chain and subsidiary of Woolworths (New Zealand), itself a subsidiary of Australia's Woolworths Group. It was one of two supermarket chains in New Zealand, the other being Foodstuffs.

Up until the rebrand, there were 194 Countdown stores, with 61 in Auckland.

In July 2023, the company announced that all Countdown stores would be rebranded back to Woolworths, the name of the parent company and name of the supermarket used in Australia. The rebrand came into effect from early 2024 with signage changing over the following two years.

== History ==
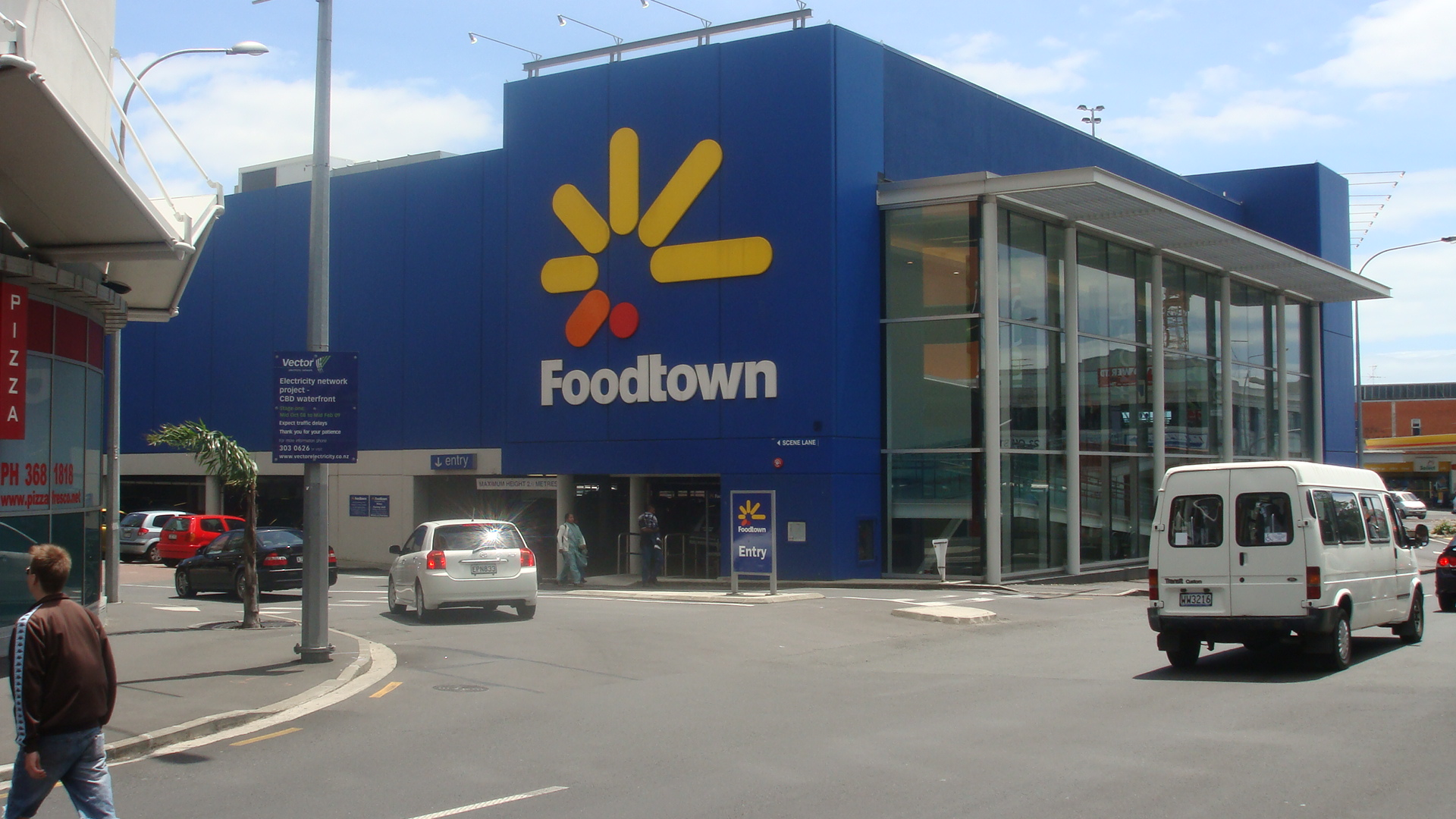
Foodtown in Auckland CBD, 2008

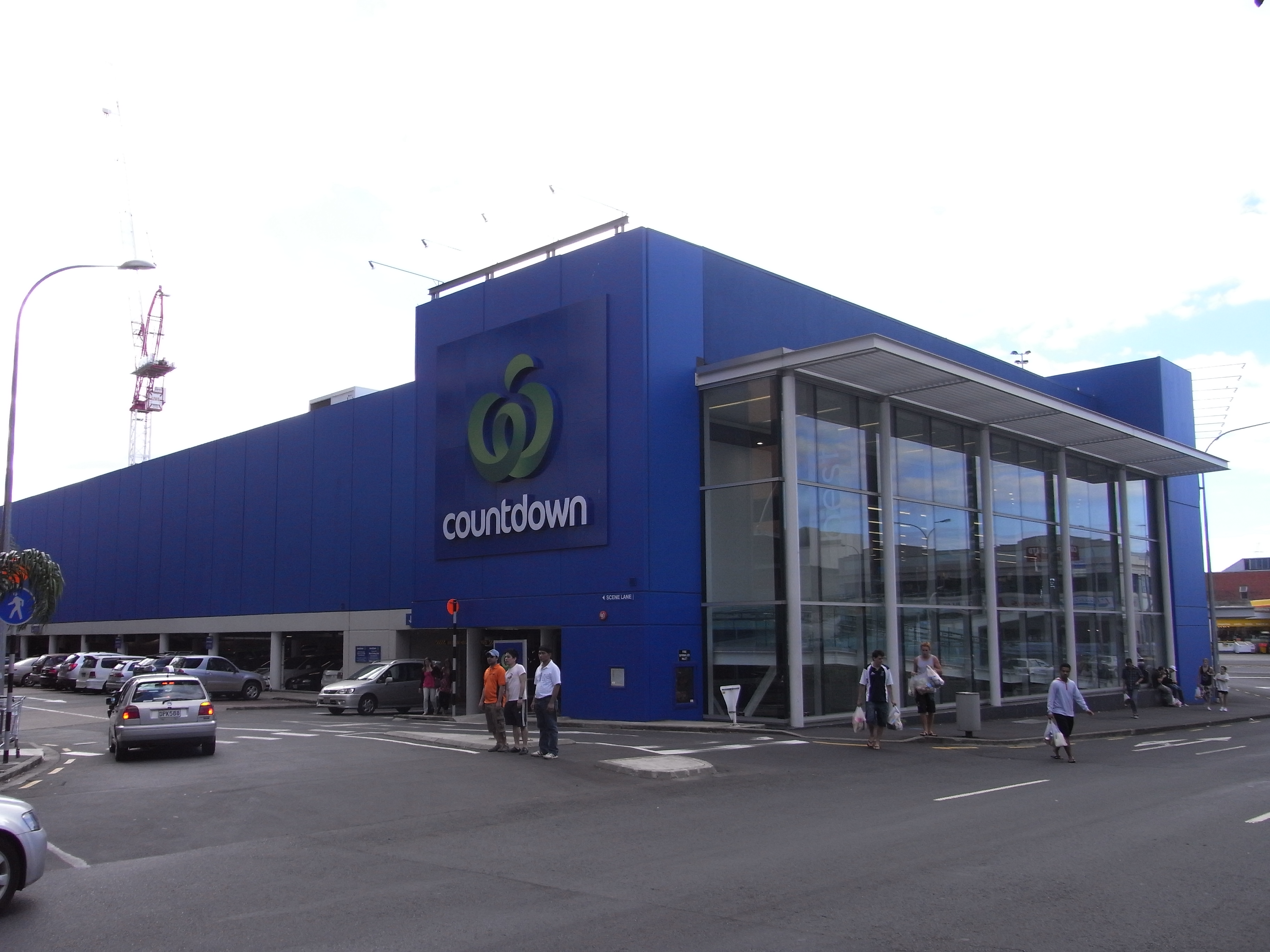
The same store rebranded as Countdown, 2010

=== Discount supermarket chain (1981–2008) ===
The first Countdown Foodbarn store opened in May 1981 at the Northlands Shopping Centre in Christchurch. The store was owned by Rattrays Wholesale. The Rattrays Wholesale Group later included Rattrays Cash and Carry warehouses, tobacco vans (latter known as Red Arrow Distributors) and the SuperValue franchised supermarkets. By the end of 1981, stores had opened in Sydenham and New Brighton.

In 1992, Foodland Associated Limited bought J. Rattray & Son (which included Countdown) for $175 Million (NZD) from the Magnum Corporation.

Foodland acquired the majority shareholding of Progressive Enterprises from Coles Myer in 1993 and shortly after sold Countdown & Rattray to Progressive Enterprises. Progressive was later delisted from the New Zealand stock exchange in 1999.

During the period of 1993–2005, Countdown changed from a foodmarket type format offering mainly groceries to a "full-service discount supermarket". The stores vary in size due to the consolidation of brands after the merger with Woolworths (NZ) Ltd. A number of Big Fresh, Price Chopper, and 3 Guys stores were rebranded to Countdown stores during after this merger.

FAL bought Woolworths (NZ) Ltd. from its Hong Kong-based owners Dairy Farm Group in 2002. The sale saw Progressives brands (Foodtown, Countdown, 3 Guys, SuperValue and FreshChoice) joined by Woolworths, Big Fresh and Price Chopper. With the purchase Progressives market share increased to around 45% of the NZ market.

In 2003, Progressive Enterprises closed its Auckland and Christchurch distribution centres and rehired the redundant workers. Woolworths Australia purchased Progressive Enterprises from Foodland Associated Limited on 24 November 2005.

In October 2006, Progressive Enterprises announced a discount fuel scheme with Gull Petroleum and Shell to offer discounts on petrol when shoppers spend $40 or more in their Woolworths, Foodtown or Countdown stores. This scheme was similar to the one their parent company Woolworths Limited offered in Australia. The Australian Competition & Consumer Commission investigated whether the activity was anticompetitive. The result of which was an undertaking by the parent company to change its methods of offering fuel discounts in Australia. Foodstuffs stores in New Zealand also offered fuel discounts at BP and their own New World and Pak'nSave fuel sites.

In July 2008, Onecard, which could previously only be used at Woolworths and Foodtown, was extended to Countdown.

In October 2008, Countdown had 13 stores.

=== National supermarket chain (2008–2023) ===
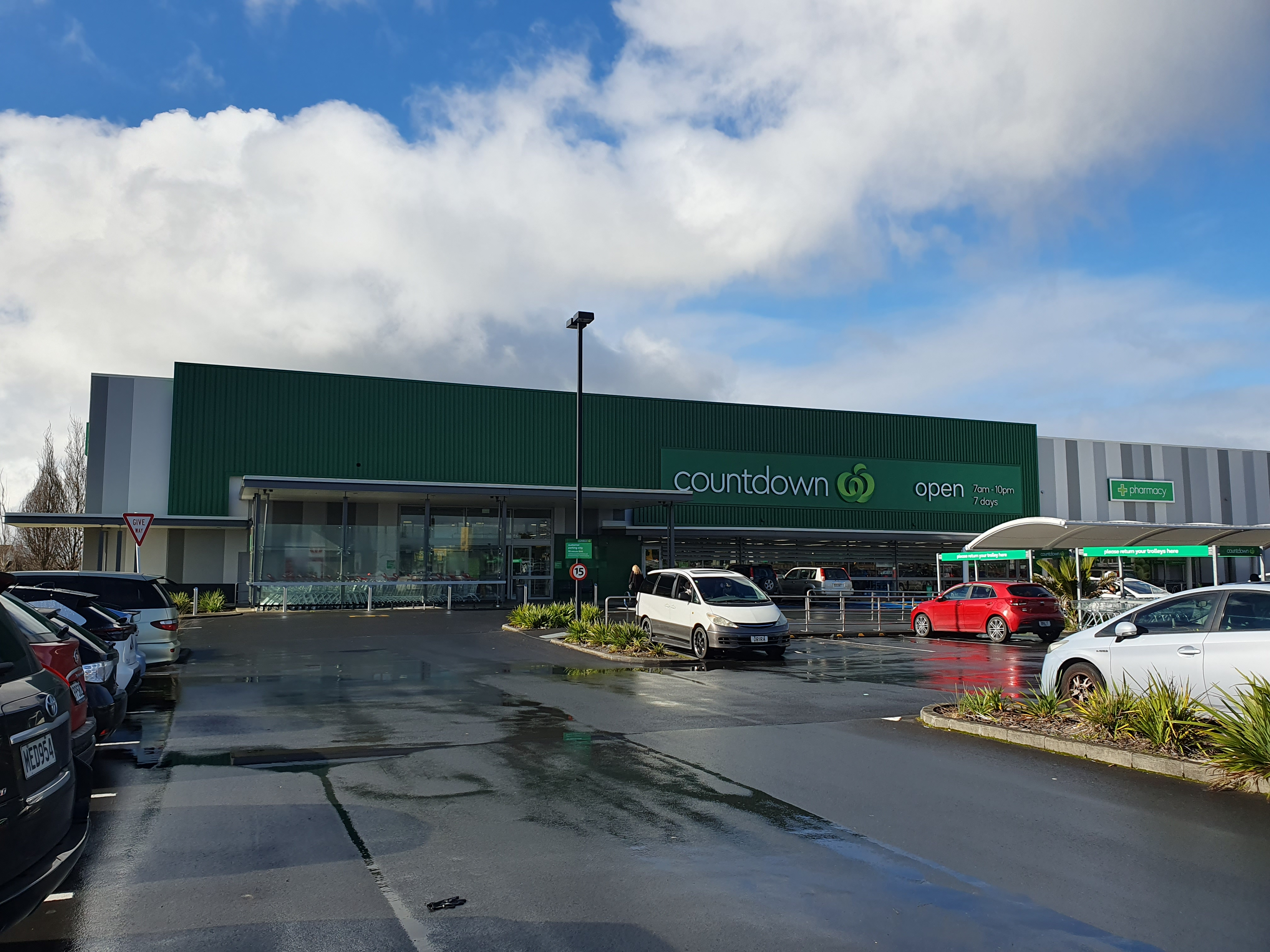
Countdown-branded supermarket on Lincoln Road, Henderson, West Auckland

There are two Countdown supermarkets in Napier

In September 2009, Progressive Enterprises announced it would re-brand all its Foodtown and Woolworths stores to Countdown as stores were refurbished. The final Foodtown and Woolworths locations to be re-branded were Browns Bay and Meadowlands respectively, both on 14 November 2011. A single Woolworths outlet continued to operate at Mount Maunganui's Bayfair Shopping Centre until late 2018. The store was not rebranded because a Countdown already existed at the centre. The store has now closed due to the centre expanding. Johnsonville and Upper Hutt in the Wellington region both have two Countdown stores less than 150 m (160 yd) apart – the result of one pre-existing Countdown store and one larger rebranded Woolworths store. A similar situation occurred in Highland Park, Auckland, where a former Foodtown was rebranded to a Countdown alongside a newer Countdown in the same shopping centre. Similar happened in Glenfield, Auckland, with two stores at either end of the same level, and in Napier, where two Countdown stores are directly across the road from each other. Also in Auckland, There are two Countdowns just across the street in Westgate.

Countdown stores existing before the initial rebranding generally retain the old style logo (although some have been updated) but the rebranded Woolworth/Foodtown stores have been updated to display the new style logo.

In February 2012, Countdown had 84 stores.

On 10 December 2012, Countdown launched its first Countdown branded in-store pharmacy. On 3 November 2014, Countdown began selling low-cost travel and life insurance through a deal with insurance giant Cigna. On 1 August 2016, Countdown began its partnership with BP and Caltex through the AA Smartfuel programme to offer fuel discounts, replacing its partnership with Z. The partnership with Gull continued until October 2016.

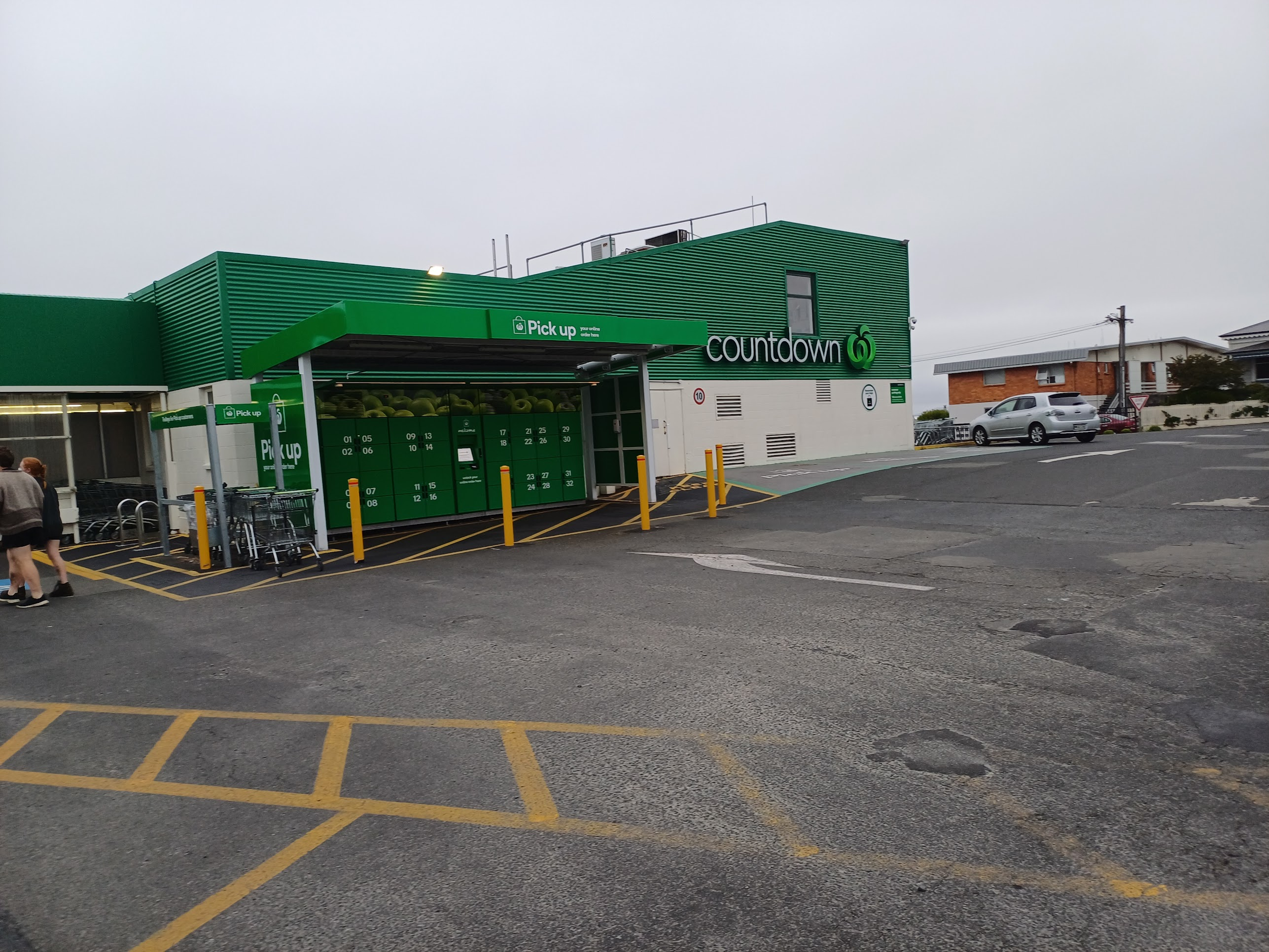
Countdown in Mornington, Dunedin before the rebrand to Woolworths

In 2019, a quiet-hour was introduced to the supermarkets for customers who had ear or eye sensitivities.

During the national lockdowns in response to COVID-19 pandemic in New Zealand, Countdown limited the number of customers allowed inside stores at any one time.

On 10 May 2021, a stabbing attack occurred at the Countdown supermarket in central Dunedin, leaving four injured. On 3 September 2021, another stabbing attack occurred at the LynnMall Countdown in New Lynn, injuring at least six. The attacker was shot and killed by police.

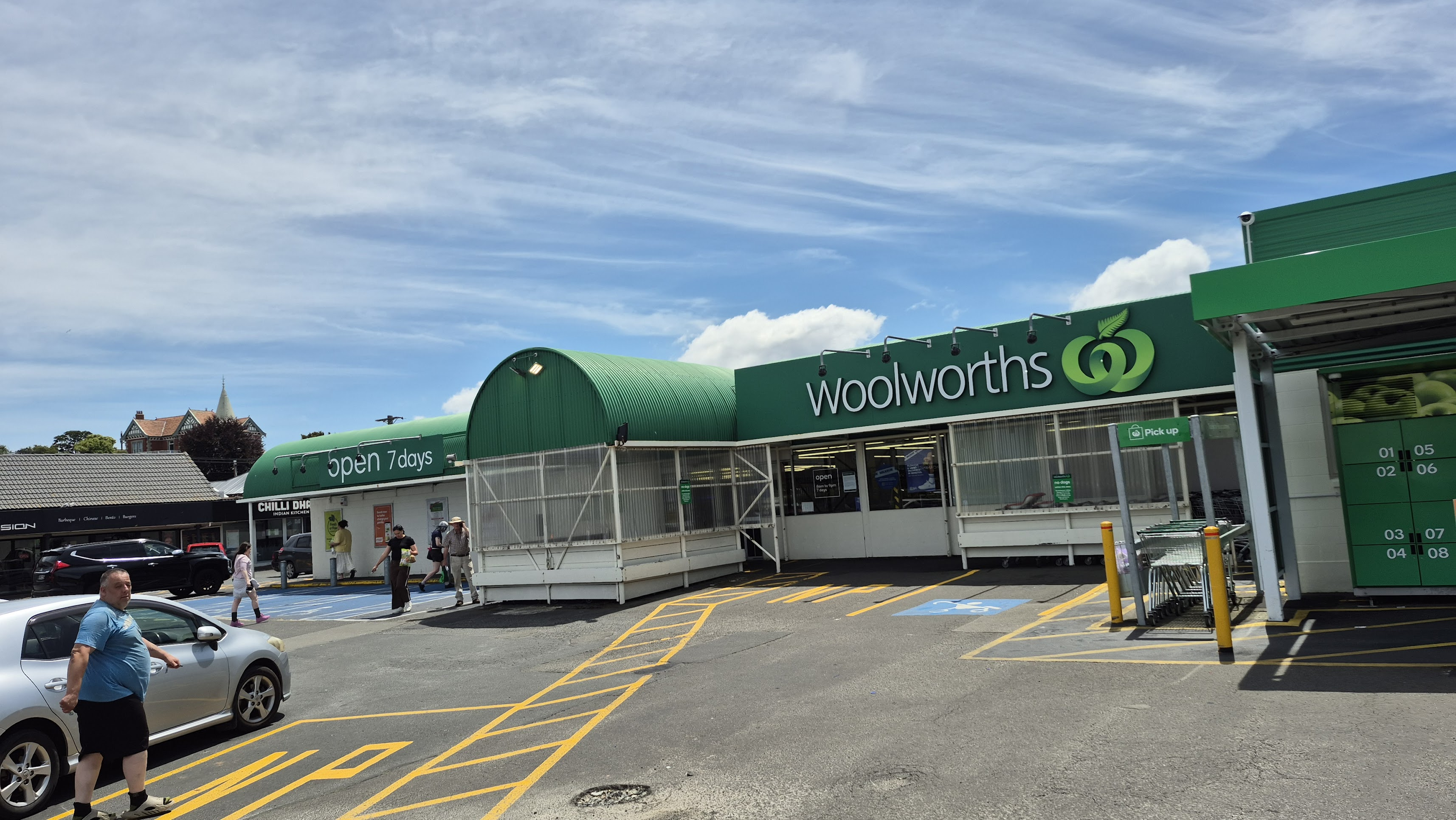
Countdown in Mornington, Dunedin after the rebrand to Woolworths

In June 2023 the High Court ruled that five Countdown pharmacies were running unlawfully. Countdown was previously granted permission by the Ministry of Health to operate these pharmacies, but the court decided that these were invalid. A requirement is that 51% of a pharmacy must be owned by a pharmacist, which was not the case with these supermarkets.

=== Rebrand to Woolworths (2023) ===
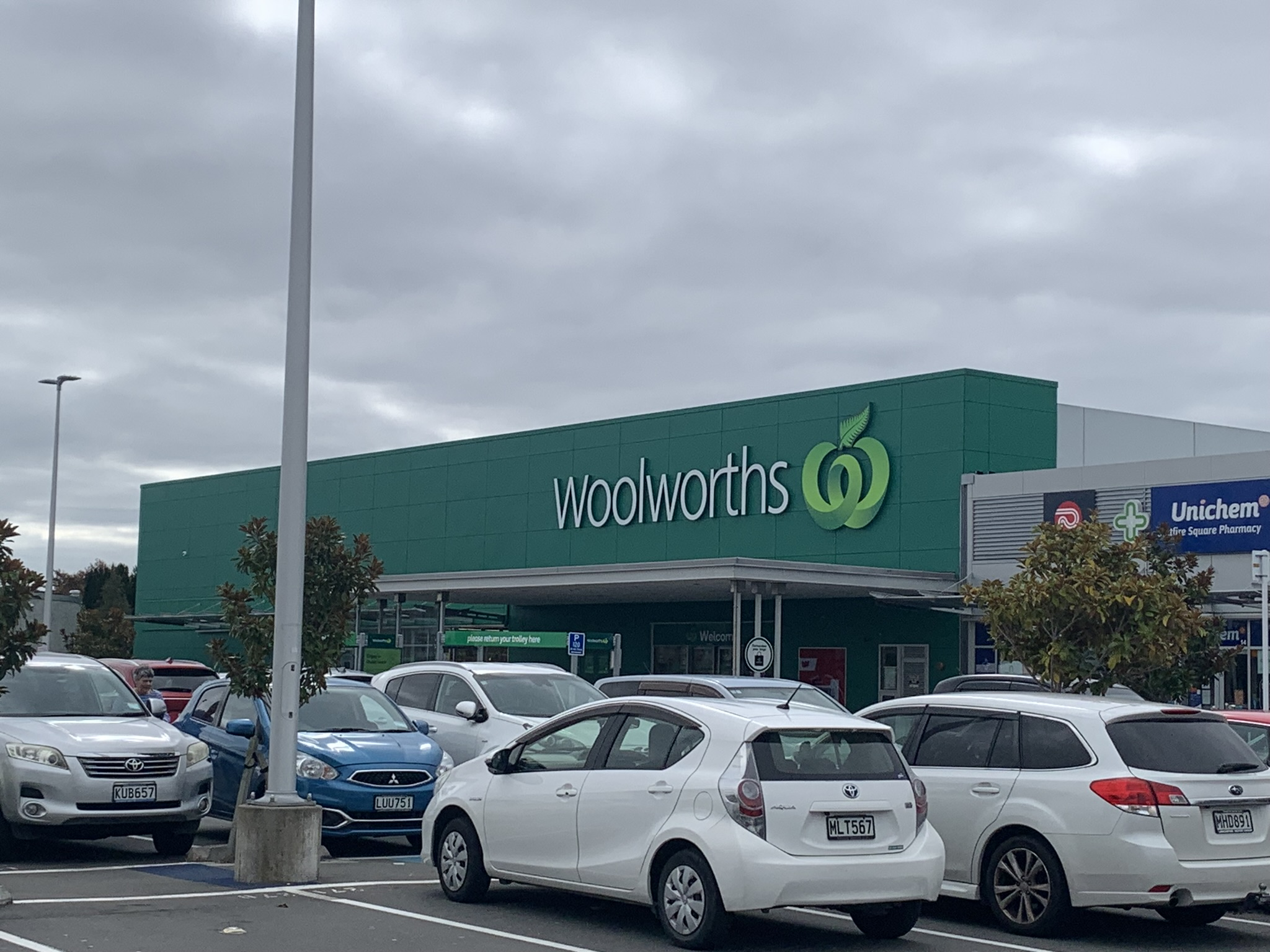
The Countdown location at Christchurch Airport, having been rebranded to Woolworths

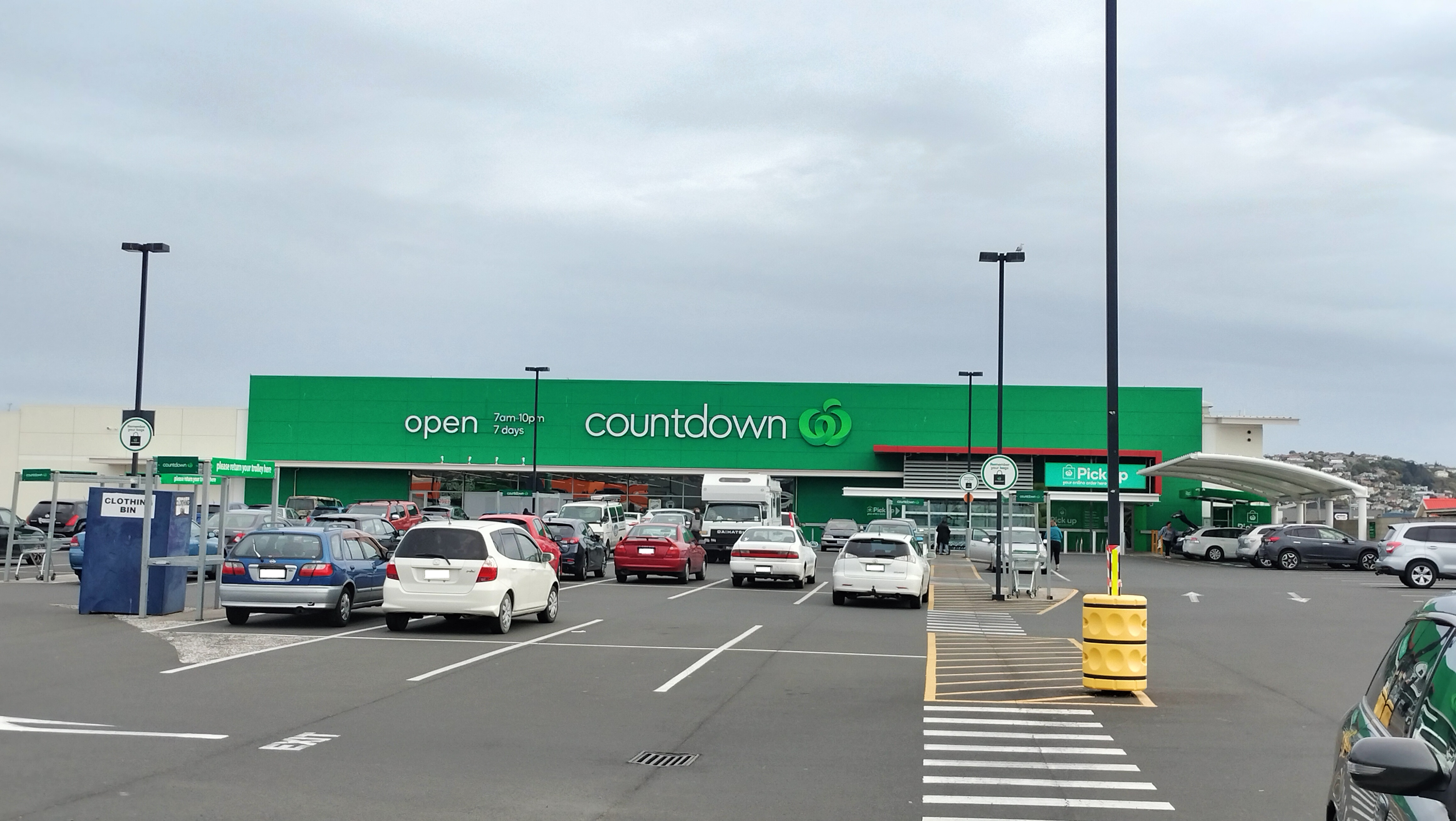
The Countdown supermarket in South Dunedin

In July 2023, the company announced that all Countdown stores will be rebranded back to Woolworths, the name of the parent company and name of the supermarket used in Australia. The rebrand will come into effect from early 2024 with signage changing over the next 2 years, this is part of a transformation programme that will cost a total of $400m.

Five Countdown stores started trialling security cameras at self-checkouts in August 2023. In November, Woolworths announced that they would be placing a three-and-a-half health star rating for foods placed in checkouts. This means that kid's confectionery will be removed. It follows a similar change made in Australian Woolworths shops.

In late January 2024, a rat infestation was reported at a Woolworths New Zealand store at South Dunedin. A staff member reported the infestation to the Otago Daily Times newspaper after staff had raised the matter with the store management a few months earlier in 2023. The Ministry for Primary Industries (MPI) launched an investigation of the store's pest management practices. Woolworths New Zealand confirmed that it had contracted the services of several specialist pest controllers and would cooperate with MPI's investigation. On 9 February, Countdown Dunedin South was closed after more rats were found inside the store.

On 13 February, a mouse was spotted at another Woolworths New Zealand store at Eastgate in Christchurch. This incident prompted New Zealand Food Safety to launch an independent review of Woolworth's national pest management processes. By 15 February, the South Dunedin store's closure was extended until at least 19 February after a total of 24 rats were caught. Food Safety Minister Andrew Hoggard stated that people were right to expect the "highest" hygiene standards at supermarkets and confirmed he was monitoring the Food Safety investigation into Countdown's pest management practices. On 16 February, Woolworths NZ issued a public apology for the pest sightings at its stores. In addition, birds were sighted at the Woolworths Grey Lynn store in Auckland. Woolworths also attracted criticism from First Union after Countdown employees in Dunedin were threatened with dismissal if they spoke to the media. The company subsequently apologised for the tone of the message. Countdown South Dunedin reopened on 28 February after 18 days, with a total of 24 rats caught. In early December 2025, Woolworths New Zealand admitted to one charge of violating the Food Act 2014 in relation to the South Dunedin rodent infestation. In late March 2026, Woolworths was fined NZ$33,000 in relation to the 2024 rodent infestation.

In early February 2024 Woolworths replaced its loyalty schemes Onecard and Onecard Visa with Everyday Rewards. During the launch, customers were awarded points upon account creation, and points were able to be gifted to other people. Some customers exploited this by creating several fake accounts and gifting their main account.

== Operations ==
As of September 2018, there were a total of 180 Countdown supermarkets operating throughout the North and South Islands of New Zealand.

Major store operations are handled in Woolworths NZ's head office in Mangere, Auckland. The stores are divided in between 10 areas. Each area has an Area Manager (or Group Manager as they are sometimes called), and all areas are supported by a National Operations Manager. Previously, the areas were split into North and South regions, with 5 areas each.

Pricing and specials are divided into two regions: North Island and South Island. Internally, the North Island region is further subdivided into two sub-divisions: Upper and Lower.

Countdown also provides New Zealand wide online grocery delivery services through its online grocery shop.

"New Generation" Countdowns – those that have been built or refurbished since mid-2008 – have 30% of their retail floor space dedicated to fresh foods, a wider range of products than older Countdown stores (up to 30,000 items), and heating and refrigeration systems that are more energy-efficient and sustainable than older Countdown stores.

=== Logistics ===
All grocery items and general merchandise is supplied to stores through one of four distribution centres: at the head office in Auckland (National DC), one in Wiri (Upper North Island DC), in Palmerston North (Lower North Island), and in Christchurch (South Island). Deliveries are made daily to stores.

Chilled and frozen goods are supplied to stores by third party logistics operator Versacold. They operate three distribution centres in Auckland, Palmerston North and Christchurch, and deliver to stores daily.

Produce is supplied to stores by third party Freshmax. Fruit and vegetables from across New Zealand and the world are sent to the three distribution centres in Auckland, Wellington, and Christchurch, where they are shipped to stores daily. However, only certain stores receive a Sunday delivery.

In recent years, Countdown has moved away from having on-site butcheries and have moved to centralized facilities. Cabinet Ready Meat (CRM: pre-cut and pre-packed meat) is supplied to non-butchery stores from a central plant in Auckland. Due to the complications of logistics in shipping CRM to the South Island, all South Island Countdowns have retained their butcheries.

== Competition ==
Countdown's main competitors are both owned by co-operative Foodstuffs – the other player in the New Zealand supermarket duopoly – in the form of full-service supermarket chain New World (with 140 stores across NZ) and lower-cost 'food warehouse' Pak'nSave (57 supermarkets mainly concentrated in larger urban areas).

In terms of pricing, Countdown generally places on par with New World and above Pak n Save. In a September 2009 Consumer magazine survey, Countdown was placed third in Auckland, with a basket of 40 brand-name items costing $136, four dollars higher than New World and $21 higher than Pak'n Save. A year earlier in September 2008, a Consumer magazine survey placed Countdown second in Auckland, with a basket of 15 private label items costing $38.24, $0.91 higher than fellow Progressive Enterprises' brand Woolworths (the Woolworths stores in question have since been rebrand as Countdown), and $1.87 lower than third-place Pak'n Save.

== Marketing and branding ==
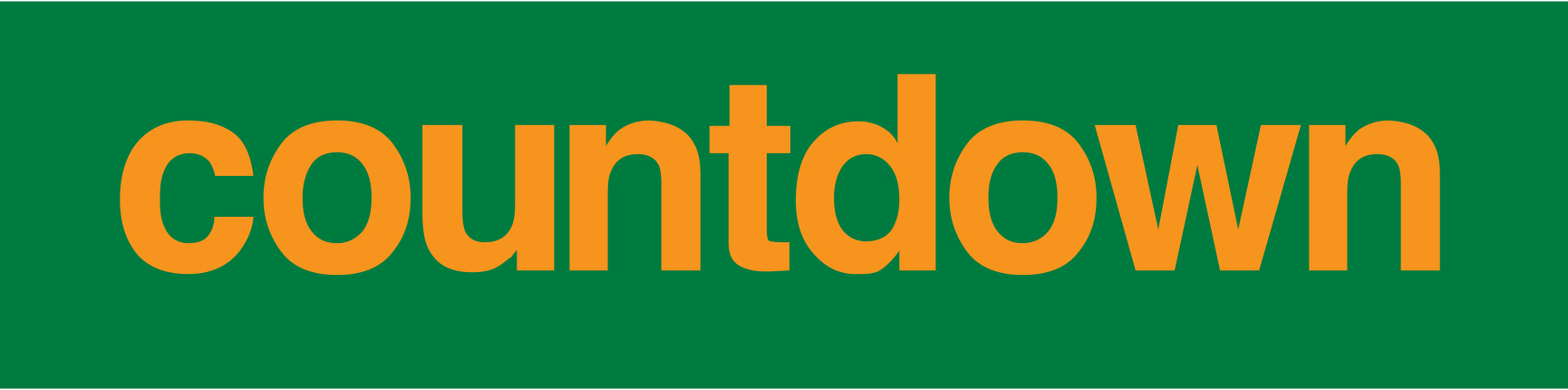
Logo used from 1981 to 2008

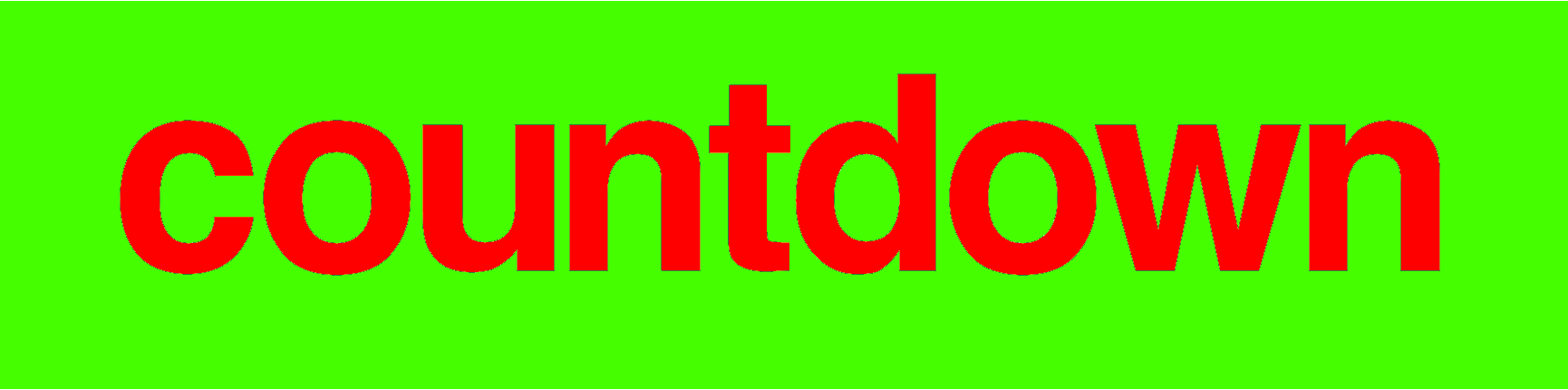
Logo used from 2008 to 2009

Logo used from 2009 to 2018

New Countdown branding was introduced on 21 September 2009. The word "Countdown" reused the original logo's red colour, but with a newly adapted font-type. The previous light green background was replaced with a white one and a logo with the "Shop Smarter" slogan was added. The logo – representing fresh produce – is also used by Australian Woolworths outlets. As of 2018, the font used in the logo was changed to one more similar to the Australian Woolworths, and itself is dark green, but when used on stores it is white.

On stores, the slogan is missing and the word "Countdown" is white. The logo and name sit on a dark grey background. On newer Countdowns, however (those built after 2013) the logo and name sit on a dark green background. Some older stores still have the old branding, which is the lettering 'Countdown' in red or orange on either a light or dark green background.

"Shop Smarter" – Countdown's current slogan was introduced in mid-2009 to the Countdown, Woolworths and Foodtown brands. The new slogan also accompanied the introduction of "The Smart Shopper", a series of 60-second twice-weekly television segment hosted by Richard Till.

=== Countdown Kids Hospital Appeal ===
From August to November every year, every Countdown store conducts fundraisers for sick children, using techniques including selling $2 wristbands and $5 raffle tickets.

=== Food donations ===
In 2011 Countdown put a formal structure in place, partnering with the Salvation Army to launch Countdown Food Rescue. This nationwide programme ensures that food that can't be sold but is still fit for consumption is put to good use. Their stores also have trolleys where customers can place items inside of them and the contents are donated.

== Loyalty schemes ==
Countdown had two major loyalty schemes called Onecard and Onecard Visa. These were replaced with Everyday Rewards in February 2024.

=== Onecard ===
Countdown used a discount and rewards programme called "OneCard" which was introduced in July 2003 and was shared by the Woolworths and Foodtown brands. The actual Onecard is a standard magnetic stripe card that is loaded into the POS system via the EFTPOS terminal. AA Members were able to use their membership card. Countdown's Onecard specials are the predominantly visible price on member-discounted products. The non-promotional price is displayed below.

Onecard was discontinued and replaced by Everyday Rewards effective 1 February 2024.

==== Onecard Visa ====
Onecard Visa was a Visa card based on Onecard. It was the same as the regular Visa cards and had additional rewards features.

=== Fuel discounts ===
Introduced in 2006, Countdown supermarkets began offering fuel discounts for transactions of $40 and over (as of September 2009). In August 2016 fuel discounts redeemable at BP, Caltex and Gull petrol stations replaced the former arrangement with Shell/Z.

Eight years after partnering with AA Smartfuel, Countdown discontinued its fuel discount offerings, as part of the wider discontinuation of its Onecard programme in early 2024.

== Private label brands ==
As of 2018, Countdown had seven private label brands – of which all except Signature Range and 'Countdown' branded products are in common with private label brands of Woolworths Supermarkets Australia.

- Countdown Own Brand – A range of products; which are also claimed to be healthier than fully branded products.
- Free From – Grocery items for specific dietary requirements.
- Macro / Macro Free Range / Macro Organic – Grocery products from organic and free-range sources.
- Woolworths Essentials – Low-cost and 'essential' items, normally with plain packaging, typically including solid colours.
- The Odd Bunch – A range of fresh produce at a lower price due to irregularities in shape or size.
- Platitude – A range of plant-based options, such as plant-based meat substitutes.
- Countdown Gold – A range of limited-edition premium products, often Christmas exclusives.

In 2016, Countdown began the process of merging their Homebrand, Select and Signature Range brands to their Woolworths Essentials and Countdown Value, Everyday, and Finest brands. The Homebrand brand was converted to Essentials and the Select and Signature range to the Countdown brand over the course of 2016, 2017 and 2018. The Free From, Macro and Gold brands were not merged.

== See also ==
- Woolworths (New Zealand)
- Woolworths (Australia)
- Albert Gubay
