= Supermarkets in New Zealand =

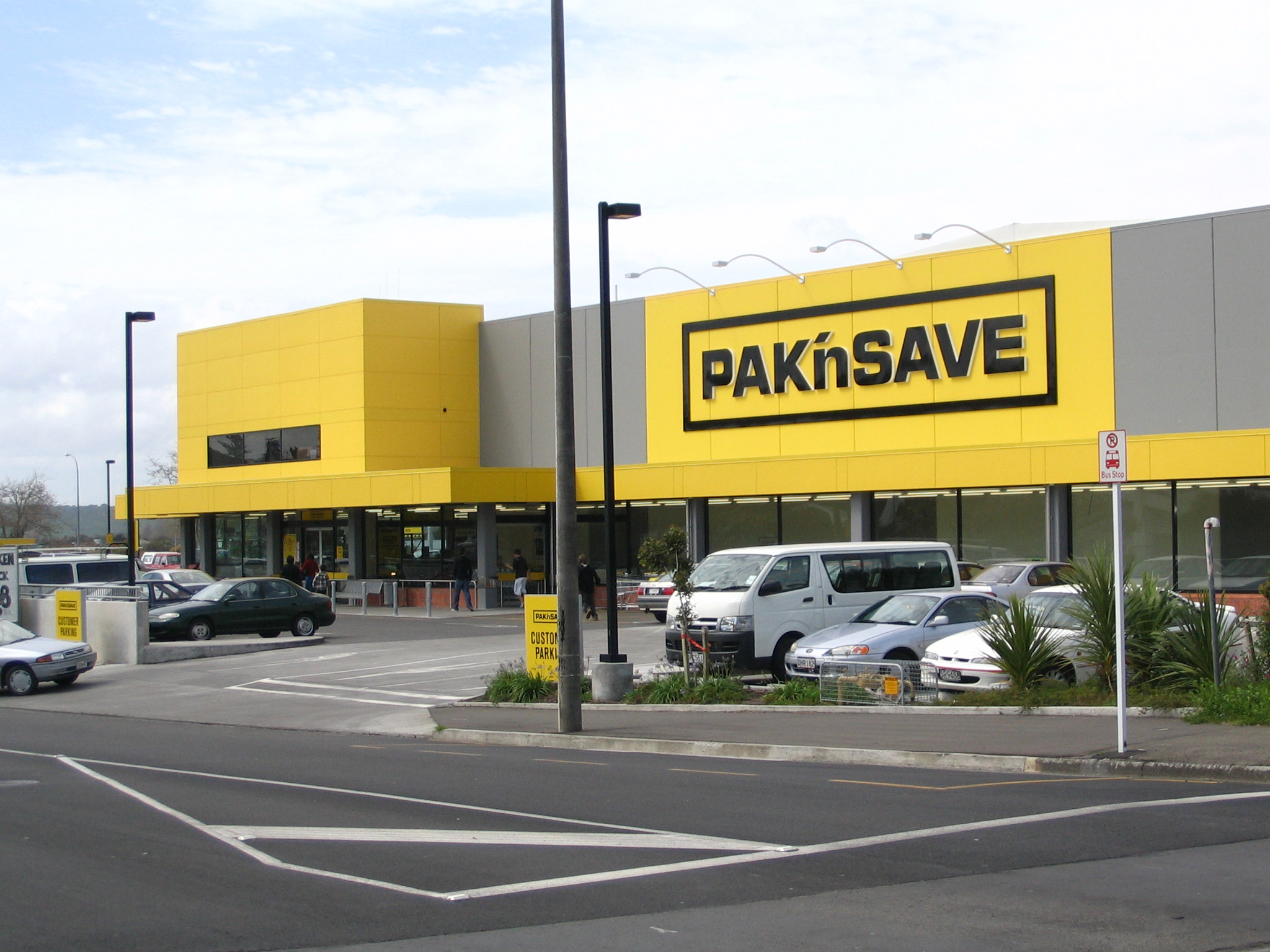
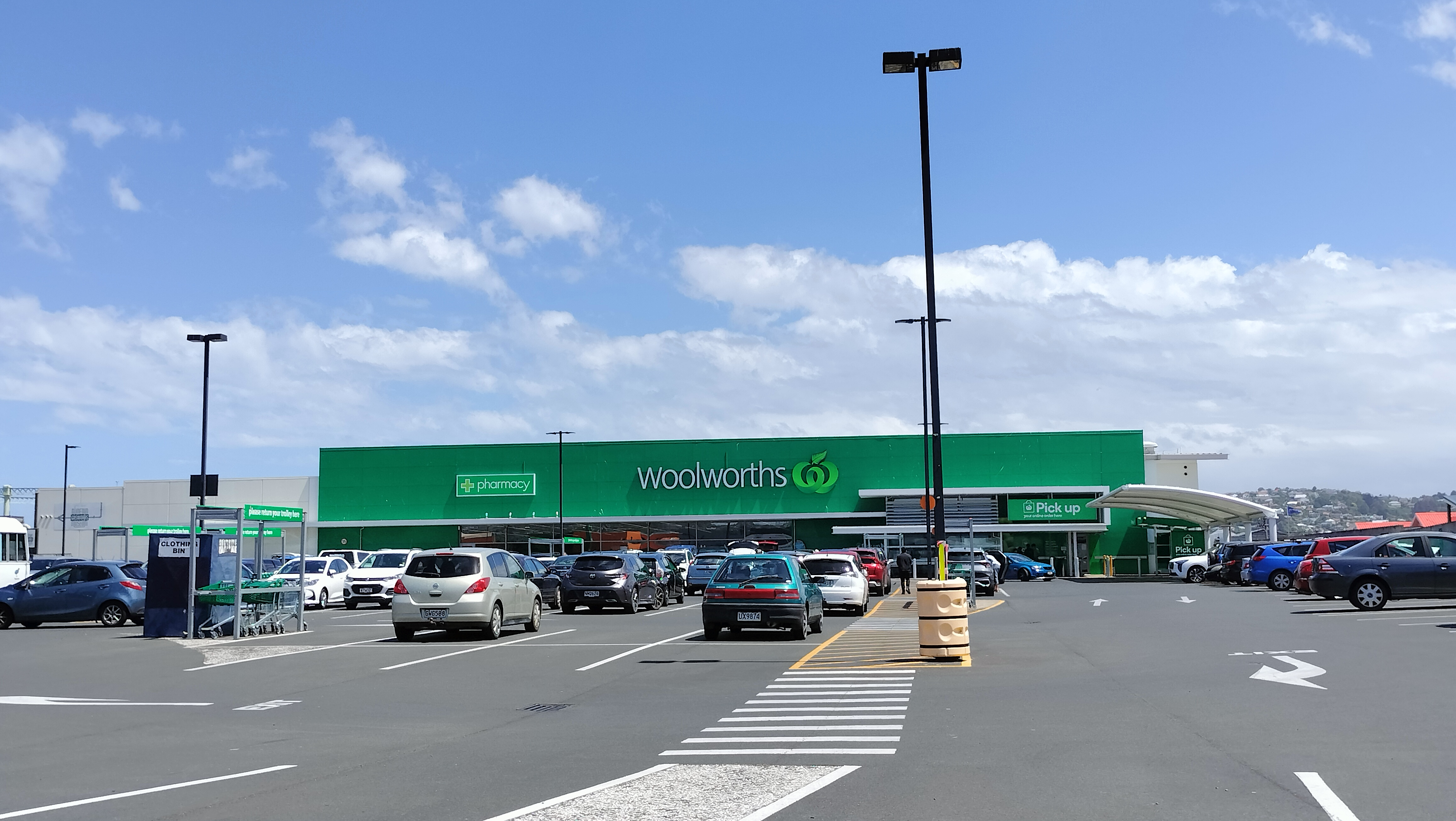
A Foodstuffs-run Pak'nSave supermarket in Whanganui and a Woolworths store in South Dunedin

The New Zealand supermarket industry currently operates as a duopoly, run by Foodstuffs and Woolworths, who together have a 90% market share.

== Overview ==
The grocery sector is valued at $25 billion as of 2024. It is characterised as a duopoly, operated by Foodstuffs (who run supermarkets Pak'nSave, New World and Four Square) and Woolworths (which runs Woolworths, FreshChoice and SuperValue supermarkets). Together, they have 90% market share. They have vertically integrated into wholesale, for example by owning fishing fleets. Each of these companies have own brands. Most of Foodstuffs' own brands are sold under Pams, Pams Finest, and the rest under Pams Value; Woolworths also has own brands, including Homebrand and Macro Wholefoods. The third largest grocery operator is Reduced to Clear, a discount grocer operating in New Zealand since 2008. Reduced to Clear is known for offering a core range of goods, similar to everyday value deals at other supermarkets, as well as it Clearance range - offering goods for 40-80% Off RRP. Reduced to Clear is currently in 18 locations across the North and South Island.

== History ==
Supermarkets first appeared in New Zealand in the 1920s, starting with the Four Square brand. The first self-service Four Square opened in 1948. The first Foodtown supermarket was opened in 1958, and the first Pak'nSave opened in 1985.

== Duopoly ==
In the 1980s and 1990s many mergers and acquisitions consolidated the industry until it became a duopoly run by Foodstuffs and Woolworths. The last of these supermarkets was Foodtown, which was bought by Progressive Enterprises in the 2000s, now known as Woolworths.

In 2020 the New Zealand public became increasingly concerned with the price of groceries, which spurred the Commerce Commission to study the market's competition. The study looked at whether the market was competitive enough, and if not, what could be done to improve it. The study found that the market was not competitive enough, and if it was more competitive, supermarkets would improve prices, quality and range. It also found that supermarkets earned $430 million per year or $1 million per day in excess profits between 2015 and 2019, which was due to a 12.9% return on capital which would decrease by $430 million if it became 5.5%. The Commission recommended creating a grocery regulator and a dispute resolution scheme, and did not recommend a breakup of Foodstuffs or Woolworths.

In June 2022, the Commerce (Grocery Sector Covenants) Amendment Bill was passed which prevents supermarkets from setting lease agreements that block competitors from opening shop in the surrounding area.

In June 2023 the Grocery Industry Competition Bill had its final reading which was made to increase competition and efficiency in the sector. One such method was establishing a Grocery Commissioner, whose job is to "level the playing field and hold the sector to account". The first commissioner is Pierre van Heerden, who was appointed in July. In September, the government established the Grocery Code of Conduct, which includes that contracts must be in plain English, that supermarkets must pay suppliers on time, and that they must operate "in good faith". Fines for not complying can be the higher value of 3% turnover or $3 million, or a fine of $200,000 to individuals. The Code of Conduct is enforced by the Grocery Commission.

In January 2024 the Grocery Commission started investigating if the pricing and promotional strategies of Woolworths and Foodstuffs comply with the Fair Trading Act. This followed complaints made by Consumer NZ about the supermarkets and the Act in August 2023. In February the Grocery Commissioner launched a whistleblower tool which allows suppliers to anonymously complain about anti-competitive practices. The tool was made anonymous to prevent any retaliation.

=== Attempts to break the duopoly ===
In 2021 a small convenience store business Night 'n Day called for the separation of wholesalers and retailers. In 2022 The Warehouse Group stated that they were "seriously considering" selling more groceries, which it already sold a limited selection of. In 2023 it increased its grocery offerings. During New Zealand First's campaign launch on 23 July for the 2023 New Zealand general election, Winston Peters announced that one of the issues party would campaign on would be the supermarket duopoly. 2degrees founder and Monopoly Watch Spokesman Tex Edwards said in 2023 that creating a new competitor would cost at least $1.1 billion. Edwards advocates for the breakup of the supermarkets.

On 27 August, Economic Growth Minister Nicola Willis announced that the Sixth National Government would amend the Fast-track Approvals Act 2024 to accelerate the consent process for new supermarket chains seeking to enter the New Zealand supermarket market. Willis said that this new "express lane" policy would help break the Foodstuffs-Woolworths supermarket duopoly. In response, the Green Party's commerce and consumer affairs spokesperson Ricardo Menéndez March said that the Government's proposed policy did not go far enough and urged the Government to breakup the supermarket duopoly. Labour's finance spokesperson Barbara Edmonds said that the fast-track regime would not help ordinary New Zealanders but declined to outline Labour's alternative policy.

The Government's Fast-track Approvals Amendment Bill was introduced into Parliament on 3 November 2025 and passed its first reading on 6 November. Parliament's environment select committee used a loophole in parliamentary rules that shortened the public consultation timeframe for the proposed legislation from the standard six weeks to 11 days. By 8 December, the environment select committee had received 2,518 written submissions and 85 oral submissions on the amendment bill, with 95% of submitters opposed to the amendments. Key concerns included the potential removal of environmental safeguards, curbs on the role and powers of the panels and empowering the Infrastructure Minister to designate certain projects as nationally or regionally significant. The bill passed into law on 11 December 2025 with some amendments.

=== 2026 general election ===
During the lead-up to the 2026 New Zealand general election, several parties campaigned on breaking up the country's supermarket duopoly as a means of reducing grocery prices and promoting competition. On 19 April, New Zealand First proposed splitting Foodstuffs into two countrywide cooperatives—where one operates New World and Four Square, and the other operates Pak'nSave—in order to compete with Woolworths. On 6 September, the Green Party proposed creating a new supermarket chain called KiwiMart, by purchasing 120 supermarkets from Foodstuffs and Woolworths, along with two distribution centres, at an estimated cost of $2.8 billion. On 16 September, the National Party said it would supporting splitting Foodstuffs into two separate companies, contingent on a six-month review by the Commerce Commission into the feasibility of the split.

On 20 September, the Labour Party announced it would campaign on forcing Foodstuffs and Woolworths to separate their retail and wholesale operations in order to help small grocers and stimulate competition. On 21 September, Te Pāti Māori proposed allocating $100 million in seed funding to establishing new iwi-owned supermarkets as part of its "kai (food) sovereignty" policy. On 28 September, ACT said it campaign on introducing a one-stop consenting shop for establishing new supermarkets and accepting food labels from overseas regulators by default. ACT has opposed government intervention to break up the two supermarket chains.

In late September 2026, Newsroom reported that Foodstuffs and Woolworths were allegedly waging a "full-court press" campaign using lobbyists, public relations campaigns, political insiders and influential networks to push back against political efforts to break up the supermarket duopoly. Finance Minister Nicola Willis said that she and other MPs had experienced a coordinated lobbying campaign by the two supermarket companies. According to Newsroom, Foodstuffs employed an in-house government relations specialist, a communications professional focusing on policy and regulatory submissions, the lobbying company Thompson Lewis and corporate affairs company Sherson Willis. Thompson Lewis employed has employed several former political chiefs of staff and senior parliamentary staff including former Prime Minister John Key's chief of staff Wayne Eagleson and deputy chief of staff Paula Oliver, and former Prime Minister Helen Clark's public relations staffer GJ Thompson. Sherson Willis' co-founders Trish Sherson and Rewa Willis were former parliamentary staffers; with the former serving as the ACT party's head of communications and the latter serving as the director of the lobbying outfit "The Icehouse." Woolworths NZ has also worked with the lobbying firm Lillis Clark, whose founders Anna Lillis and Kenny Clark had worked as advisers to former National MP and cabinet minister Steven Joyce. On 23 September, the pro-business think thank, the New Zealand Initiative, issued an open letter signed by 51 business leaders urging political parties to respect property rights in response to several political parties campaigning on breaking up the supermarket companies and "gentailers", nationalising banks and rewriting retirement village contracts. The letters' signatories included Foodstuffs North Island chief executive Chris Quinn, Foodstuffs South Island chief executive Mary Devine and Trish Sherson.

Analysing political parties' supermarket policies, Adelaide University strategy senior lecturer Jonathan Baker advocated a "market-shaping" approach that would combine the best elements of each party's policies. He also expressed support for the idea of an independently governed wholesaler supplying to retail chains, while subjects to antitrust safeguards. University of Auckland senior marketing lecturer Drew Franklin said that splitting supermarket companies was only a mechanism to combating market capture of the grocery sector but that the real test was ensuring "sustained rivalry" between the different companies due to the complexity of the supermarket sector.
