= Superbank =

Former New Zealand bank

- Type: Joint venture
- Industry: Retail banking
- Founded: February 2003
- Defunct: September 26, 2006
- Fate: Mortgage portfolio sold to GE Money; venture wound up
- Headquarters: New Zealand
- Area served: New Zealand
- Products: Transaction accounts, savings accounts, mortgages
- Parent: St.George Bank and Foodstuffs

Superbank was a joint-venture retail bank in New Zealand, operated by St George Bank in association with the New Zealand grocery-retailer Foodstuffs. Superbank operated between 2003 and 2006.

Superbank provided retail transaction banking. Superbank marketed its services through product-information leaflets at New World, Pak'n Save, and Four Square. Actual banking took place through Internet and phone banking.

The company also provided mortgages via mobile lending managers and also mortgage brokers.

== Background ==
Foodstuffs announced the venture in 2002. At the time it ran the Pak'nSave, New World and Write Price chains and held about 55 percent of the New Zealand supermarket market, and it said it would apply to become a registered bank in partnership with St.George, then the fifth-largest bank in Australia. The partners planned to start with internet and telephone banking in early 2003 and to add in-store checkout banking later. A successful application would have made Superbank the country's eighteenth registered bank. Commentators likened the idea to supermarket banking in Britain and Australia and to the recently launched state-owned Kiwibank, but warned that the local market was already crowded and that lending margins were thin.

== Launch and operations ==
Superbank opened in February 2003 as the trading name of St.George Bank of New Zealand Ltd, offering accounts that customers used over the internet and by phone. The accounts were sold on a "no-frills" basis, with no fees, fixed terms or minimum balances and a variable interest rate of 5.29 percent, and the owners planned to put automated teller machines in Foodstuffs stores. Although it was promoted through Foodstuffs' supermarkets, the banking itself was done online and by telephone. The bank also lent on residential mortgages.

== Closure ==
In December 2005, St.George's managing director Gail Kelly said Superbank was under review for a possible sale, as tighter conditions and stronger competition had squeezed margins on home lending. The following August the owners sold Superbank's residential mortgage portfolio, worth around NZ$500 million, to GE Money. The transfer took effect on 3 August 2006, and affected home-loan customers were moved to GE Money. GE Money said the deal added about 2,200 customers to its New Zealand base. Superbank's deposit holders were offered a transfer of their SuperSaver savings into Kiwibank's online-call account, with any balances not moved repaid in full after 25 September 2006.

The bank closed on 26 September 2006, having lost about NZ$40 million over roughly three and a half years of operation.
