= Northlands Shopping Centre =

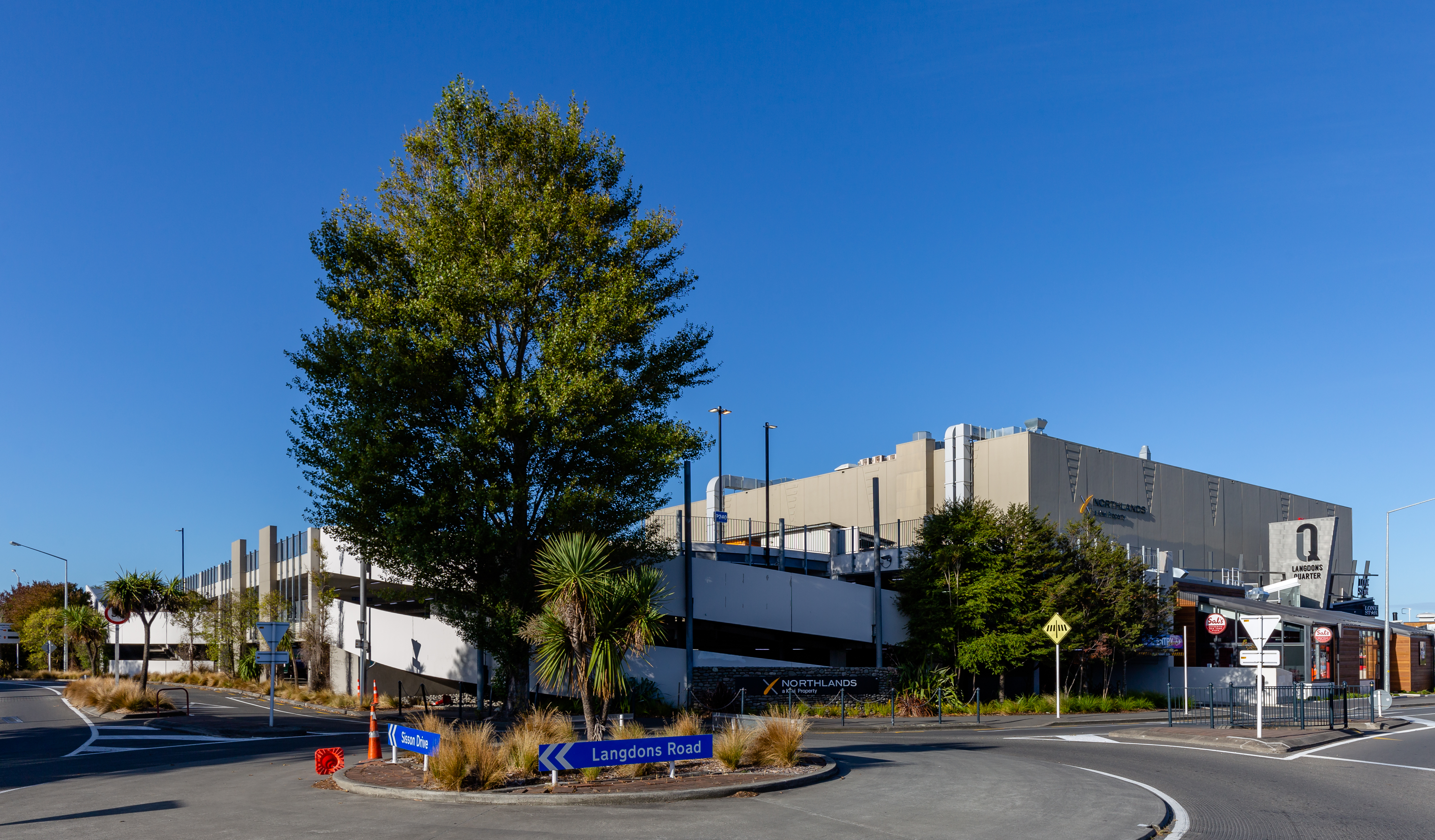
- Location: Papanui, Christchurch, New Zealand
- Coordinates: 43°29′39″S 172°36′31″E
- Address: 55 Main Road North, Papanui
- Opened: 1 November 1967; 59 years ago
- Developer: Fletcher Trust
- Manager: Kiwi Property
- Owner: Mackersy Northlands Limited Partnership
- Architect: Warren & Mahoney
- Num. of stores: 121
- Num. of anchor tenants: 5 (1 vacant)
- Floor area: 45,000 m^{2} (480,000 sq ft)
- Floors: 1 (Mezzanine in Farmers, 2 at Hoyt's)
- Website: northlands.co.nz

Northlands Shopping Centre is a shopping mall in Christchurch, New Zealand. Located in the suburb of Papanui, it opened on 1 November 1967 and is the second-largest mall in the South Island of New Zealand. Northlands has 45,000 square metres (480,000 sq ft) of retail space and contains 121 tenants. Owned by Mackersy Northlands Limited Partnership it is anchored by Farmers, Hoyts, The Warehouse, and Woolworths, previous anchor tenants include Haywrights, New World, and Pak'nSave.

== History ==
In July 1966 plans for the shopping centre were announced. The first stage would be the development of a 50,000-square-foot (4,600 m^{2}), Hay's department store and supermarket. The second stage would construct the 40,000 sq ft (3,700 m^{2}) mall, including a variety store (the space was instead tenanted by Smiths City furniture), supermarket (SuperValue Garden City), and 25 speciality stores. Off-street parking for 500–600 cars were included in the plans with a total construction cost of NZ£1 million. Construction on the first phase began in September 1966, followed by the second phase in February 1967. The shopping centre was designed by the Warren & Mahoney firm of Miles Warren and Maurice Mahoney.

The Hay's department store and supermarket opened to shoppers on 18 October 1967, the store was the largest suburban department store in New Zealand at the time. The shopping centre would open with 22 stores on 1 November 1967. Due to the Hay's opening on 18 October, traffic would back up along Main North Road and block the Harewood Road roundabout 200 metres south of the shopping centre. On 3 November for the first Friday late-night opening, traffic backed up along Main North Road and Papanui Road at times as far back as Blighs Road, 700 metres south of the shopping centre.

In 1970 following a merger between Hay's and Wright Stephenson, the store rebranded to Haywrights.

On 10 October 1979 a major extension opened, adding 44 stores and 160,000 sq ft (15,000 m^{2}) of retail space, including a new anchor tenant, New World supermarket.

In 1980, Farmers department store would acquire the Haywrights chain, rebranding to Farmers-Haywrights and then Farmers in 1982. The shopping centre began opening on Saturdays starting 21 November 1981.

In 1981, the first Countdown supermarket in New Zealand opened at Northlands, replacing SuperValue. In 1989, the store was enlarged and in 2023 rebranded to Woolworths.

In 1987, The Warehouse opened, it was expanded in 1994.

In February 1991, original anchor tenant Smiths City closed.

In 1995 the mall was re-developed, New World supermarket was replaced by Pak'nSave and the Hoyts Cinema multiplex added.

Following the 2011 Christchurch earthquake the shopping centre was extensively strengthened.

Kiwi Property sold the shopping centre to a subsidiary of Queenstown-based Mackersy Property in December 2022. Kiwi Property still manages the centre on behalf of Mackersy Property. In 2024, Pak'nSave closed its Northlands store, relocating nearby.

In 2026 it was announced that Farmers would relocate to the former Pak'nSave site and vacant its current premises. The Farmers building will be divided up for new tenants.
