= Pams (brand) =

New Zealand retail company owned by Foodstuffs

- Type: Private label
- Industry: Food
- Founded: 1937; 89 years ago
- Headquarters: New Zealand
- Area served: New Zealand
- Products: Groceries
- Parent: Foodstuffs
- Website: pams.co.nz

Pams (previously Pam's) is a New Zealand company, owned by Foodstuffs, which also owns the New World, Pak'n Save and Four Square supermarket chains. Pams sources and brands a wide range of supermarket goods as a house brand.

== History ==
Pam's former logo

Pams was launched through Four Square in 1937. Its first goods were baking powder and custard powder. It was originally going to be named "Pep" or "Presto", but both names were rejected. The name "Pep" was rejected as it was already taken by Kellogg's. It is not known who Pams is named after.

In 2000, celebrity chef Jamie Oliver signed up on advertisements for Pam's, with the company also sponsoring Oliver's television show Oliver's Twist. In 2008 Pams eggs became cage free.

In 2017, Foodstuffs silently released a new brand called "Pams Finest".
