= Flybuys (New Zealand) =

Loyalty programme in New Zealand

- Type: Loyalty program
- Run by: Loyalty New Zealand
- Owner: Bank of New Zealand (25%); Foodstuffs (25%); IAG New Zealand (25%); Z Energy (25%)
- Area served: New Zealand
- Introduced: 1996; 30 years ago
- Discontinued: 2024; 2 years ago
- Number of users: 2.4 million
- Website: flybuys.co.nz

Flybuys, formerly Fly Buys, was New Zealand's largest customer loyalty scheme. It was administered by Loyalty New Zealand, which is owned equally by Bank of New Zealand, Foodstuffs, IAG New Zealand and Z Energy.

The programme had over 2.4 million members, representing 74 per cent of New Zealand households. Members collected points from over 50 participating brands.

== History ==
Fly Buys was launched in New Zealand in 1996. Loyalty New Zealand was established by its owners to operate the programme under licence from Loyalty Pacific, which launched the Australian Flybuys programme in 1994. The structure of the programme very closely matched the structure of its namesake programme in Australia at the time. In the first 89 days of the scheme, 300,000 households signed up for a membership.

In 2008, Fly Buys launched a programme for small to medium-sized businesses to earn points. Telecom New Zealand withdrew from Fly Buys at the end of 2008. In 2009, Fly Buys launched Fly Buys Music, allowing members to buy digital music with their points.

In August 2010, Fly Buys expanded its relationship with Air New Zealand, enabling members to redeem for any available seat on any Air New Zealand flight, while members of Air New Zealand's Airpoints programme could earn points from purchases at Fly Buys participating businesses. The relationship with Air New Zealand and Flybuys ended on 17 October 2016. Airpoints members can no longer earn points at Fly Buys partners, and Fly Buys points can no longer be redeemed for Airpoints Dollars.

In June 2020, the loyalty programme was renamed to Flybuys, with a new logo.

On 30 May 2024, Flybuys announced the programme would close at the end of 2024.

== Points and rewards ==
Flybuys could be collected for either one of three different rewards currencies (as of June 2020):

- Flybuys points - Collected across a wide range of household expenditure categories.
- Fuel discounts - Collected for fuel savings to use at Z Energy or Caltex.
- New World Dollars - Collected for use as a type of payment at New World

Everyday shopping categories included food (New World, Gilmours, Trents), fuel (Z Energy and Caltex) and liquor (Liquorland). Typical household services such as energy (Genesis Energy) and insurance provider (State) were also covered. General retailers, from whom points could be collected, included stationery, pharmacy, hardware, optometry, furniture, carpet, travel, accommodation, car servicing and others. Additional points could be collected from transactions on Bank of New Zealand credit cards, and by completing online surveys with Colmar Brunton and online reviews with Yellow.

Most retailers offered one point for every $25 spent. The exchange rate of 300 Flybuys points for 48 Air New Zealand Airpoints Dollars suggested a Flybuys point was worth about 16 cents (an Airpoints Dollar translates to one New Zealand dollar) although the equation varied with other rewards. Points expired three years after being collected.

Flybuys point rewards included merchandise, flights, entertainment and accommodation.
