= Z Energy =

New Zealand fuel station chain owned by Ampol

Z Energy Limited
- Logo used since 2010
- Trade name: Z
- Type: Subsidiary
- Industry: Oil and gas
- Predecessors: Shell New Zealand (1911–2010); Greenstone Energy Limited (2010–2011)
- Founded: 1911
- Headquarters: 3 Queens Wharf, Wellington, 6011, New Zealand
- Number of locations: 247 (2024)
- Area served: New Zealand and Australia
- Key people: Lindis Jones (CEO); Greg Barnes (Chair)
- Products: Diesel, petrol and oil
- Services: Fuel stations
- Revenue: ▲$7.61 billion (2023)
- Net income: ▼$16 million (2023)
- Total assets: ▼$1.39 billion (2023)
- Number of employees: 2,235
- Parent: Ampol

Z Energy is a New Zealand fuel distributor with branded service stations. It has been a subsidiary of Australian petroleum company Ampol since May 2022. It owns some of the former assets of Shell New Zealand and Chevron New Zealand.

Shell left the New Zealand fuel distribution business in April 2010, selling its operations to Infratil and the New Zealand Superannuation Fund, with the operations being rebranded as Z Energy in 2011. Z Energy acquired Chevron's New Zealand subsidiary Caltex in June 2016.

Z Energy operates service stations under the Z Energy and Caltex New Zealand brands. There are 289 Z Energy branded sites around New Zealand, including 60 in Auckland as of April 2023. There are also 203 Caltex branded sites, including 39 in Auckland as of April 2023.

== History ==
=== Background ===
Shell withdrew from the fuel distribution market in New Zealand in 2010. Shell's New Zealand assets, including a 17.1% stake in Refining NZ, were acquired by Infratil and the New Zealand Superannuation Fund for $891 million. However the Taranaki based exploration and production division were not part of this sale portfolio.

Z Energy currently competes with BP, ExxonMobil subsidiary Mobil NZ and several smaller independent groups such as Gull New Zealand. Former competitors included Chevron's New Zealand subsidiary Caltex which Z Energy acquired in June 2016.

=== Founding ===
In 2010 the branding remained as Shell whereas the holding company was renamed from Shell NZ to Greenstone Energy. After surveying 17,000 customers the following year, the company changed its name to Z Energy Limited and branded the service stations as Z. The rebranding exercise is believed to cost around NZ$60m, compared to the NZ$10m/year cost of licensing the Shell brand. The company said it would focus on better forecourt service and better food.

Following the re-branding and after adding five new service stations, the market share for petrol held by Z Energy slipped from 31.6% in 2011 to 29.0% in 2013.

Following the change in ownership, the firm has employed more New Zealanders in positions that were previously outsourced overseas including: IT, finance and call centre services.

=== Acquisition ===
In 2010, Infratil and New Zealand Superannuation Fund paid for the Shell acquisition and its 17.1% shareholding in NZ Refining with $420 million of equity funding. At the time of the acquisition from Shell, Z Energy had an ungeared balance sheet. The balance of the acquisition cost was met by borrowings by Z Energy. The stake in NZ Refining was sold to Z Energy after the IPO for $100 million. The net outlay by Infratil and New Zealand Superannuation Fund for 100% of Z Energy in 2010 was effectively $320 million.

In 2011, the 226 Shell service stations were rebranded as Z Energy stations. Later in August 2011, an advertisement by Z Energy sparked outrage through the depiction of 'New Zealand'-looking people stripping call centre equipment off 'Asian'-looking workers. Mike Bennetts subsequently apologised and Z Energy released a new advertisement showing a diverse range of actors.

Z Energy had $430 million of retail bonds at March 2013, up from zero debt in 2010 when Infratil and NZ Super Fund acquired it.

=== Before the IPO ===
The majority of the Z Energy service stations are off-balance sheet. 152 service stations are leased by Z Energy from third parties and five are independently owned. Z Energy owns 56 service stations freehold. Z Energy sold and leased back 47 service stations in 2012–13 for cash proceeds of $87 million.

Z Energy revalued upwards its remaining property plant and equipment by 54% or $170 million to a total of $481 million in April 2013.

The company also paid dividends totaling $224 million to Infratil and the New Zealand Superannuation Fund in the three-year period before the IPO, including $70 million between April 2013 and the IPO.

=== IPO ===
In July 2013, shares in Z Energy were offered in an IPO which was priced at $3.50 per share. That IPO valued Z Energy at $1.4 billion. This value was almost four and half times the net cash outlay by Infratil and NZ Super Fund to acquire it three years earlier.

The IPO prospectus showed that Z Energy expected to declare total dividends to shareholders equivalent to 6 cents per litre of fuel sold in 2013–14. This includes dividends to be paid to Infratil and NZ Super Fund immediately prior to the IPO.

Tim Hunter, deputy editor of the Fairfax Business Bureau, said that in completing the IPO, Infratil and NZ Super Fund will "have pulled off a piece of exceptional business".

Z Energy issued a prospectus for its non-underwritten IPO on 25 July 2013. The IPO will raised $840 million from a mixture of shares sold by the current parent and new shares issued.

All of the proceeds went to Infratil and New Zealand Superannuation Fund, including funds raised by the issue of new shares in Z Energy Limited. Z Energy purchased the 17.1% stake in NZ Refining for $100 million from Infratil and New Zealand Superannuation Fund after the IPO.

Following the IPO, Z Energy has 400 million shares in total. The IPO price was $3.50. This provided a market capitalisation of $1,400 million.

That market value is almost four and half times the net cash outlay of $320 million by Infratil and New Zealand Superannuation Fund to acquire Z Energy in 2010.

Infratil and New Zealand Superannuation Fund retained a combined stake of 40% in Z Energy. Z Energy is forecasting sales to fall to 2,476 million litres in 2013–14. This is 7% less than the volume in 2010-11 after addition of the five new service stations.

As the basis for Prospectus forecasts, Z Energy's profit margin was expected to increase by 1.2 cents per litre in 2013–14. The Prospectus forecast a dividend of $88 million for the 2013–14 year which is equivalent to 3.5 cents per litre sold. In addition, Z Energy paid $70 million in dividends to Infratil and New Zealand Superannuation Fund earlier in the 2013–14 year. That is a total of 6 cents in dividends per litre in 2013–14.

=== Acquisition of Chevron New Zealand ===
In April 2015, Z Energy released a statement on the intent to buy Chevron's subsidiary in New Zealand. The acquisition agreement was signed on 2 June 2015 at a cost of NZ$785 million and would have to be approved by the Overseas Investments Office (OIO) and the Commerce Commission. The acquisition also included Caltex lubrications and engine oils interests.

Z Chief Executive Mike Bennetts said that the Caltex and Challenge! brands, owned by Chevron, would continue under their own respective banners as Caltex and Challenge! were trusted brands in New Zealand. This acquisition would boost Z Energy's market share in New Zealand to 49%. This acquisition was approved by the Commerce Commission in April 2016. The acquisition was finalised on 1 June 2016.

=== Shareholder sell-down ===
On 30 September 2015 Infratil and the New Zealand Superannuation Fund released individual statements and press releases stating that they would each divest from Z Energy. Infratil will divest the entirety of their shareholding whilst the Super Fund will divest 9.25%, reducing their shareholding to 10.75%. Further in the statement of Infratil they stated the float will begin on 2 October 2015 for an average of NZ$6.00 to $6.20. The Super Fund released their statement after the closing of NZX so as to not lower the share price of Z Energy for the day's closing. In the press release the Super Fund announced "[they] would retain more than a 10 per cent share in the business; reflecting [its] confidence in Z Energy's business strategy and management team". The 29.25% offload has raised close to NZ$840 million for the two founding companies of Z Energy. It was also reported that Infratil has had a 400% return on their initial investment in Z Energy.

In 2016, further offloads started to occur with Infratil selling its remaining shares for a total of NZ$479.2 million. Whereas the New Zealand Superannuation Fund (NZSF) sold roughly 8.5% of their remaining 10% at NZ$8.01 per share; bringing the total profit for NZSF from the Z offload to NZ$1.09 billion with an initial investment of NZ$209.8 million.

=== Ampol takeover ===
In August 2021, Australian fuel company Ampol launched a takeover bid for Z Energy for NZ$2 billion. The takeover was completed in May 2022.

In April 2025, U-Go began taking over former Z Energy and Caltex sites across New Zealand, something that was already trialed in Australia two years prior, with stores across Auckland and one up in Manly.

In May 2025, Z Energy announced it would exit the retail electricity market. The company entered an agreement to sell its Flick business and Z Energy retail customers to Meridian Energy for NZ$70 million.

== Assets ==
Z Energy holds three wholly owned subsidiaries, Harbour City Properties Investments Limited for property investments and holdings as well as Z Energy ESPP Trustee Limited and Z Energy LTI Trustee Limited for trustee purposes.

Z Energy supplies 210 branded service stations and commercial, aviation, marine, chemical and bitumen clients. The company also manufactures surfactant chemicals operates coastal oil tankers, tank farm terminals and a mobile refueller.

=== New Zealand Oil Services Limited ===
Z Energy acquired a stake in this joint venture established in March 1999 by Mobil, BP Oil, and Shell NZ. Mobil left the partnership in 2000. Currently Z Energy and BP hold a 50% stake each.

=== The New Zealand Refining Company ===
Z is considered to have significant influence over its investment in The New Zealand Refining Company (Refining NZ) due to the fact that it has representation on the Board of Directors and therefore has equity accounted this investment. Based on its closing share price of $2.60 the fair value of the Group's investment in Refining NZ is $125m (2014: $1.75, $84m). Z's holding in Refining NZ is 15%.

=== Loyalty New Zealand Limited ===
Launched in 1996, Loyalty New Zealand runs Flybuys which has 2.4 million cards issued to 74% of New Zealand's households. This 25% joint operation is currently held by Z Energy, New World, State, and Bank of New Zealand.

=== Caltex brand in New Zealand ===
Z Energy also operates the Caltex brand in New Zealand under a licensing agreement with Chevron International (owner of the Caltex brand), as a result of Z's purchase of Chevron New Zealand in June 2016. This allows Z to operate both Z and Caltex brands in the country. In March 2022, the licensing agreement was renewed to allow Z to continue using the Caltex brand for a further five years.
