= VersaCold =

Canadian supply chain company

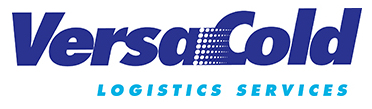
- Company type: Private
- Founded: 1946
- Headquarters: Vancouver, British Columbia
- Key people: Mike Arcamone, President & CEO
- Number of employees: 2600

VersaCold is Canada’s largest supply chain company focused exclusively on the handling of temperature sensitive products.

== Overview ==
VersaCold started in 1946 as B.C. Ice & Cold Storage Co., serving Vancouver’s fishing industry. In the decades that followed, the company expanded steadily east. By the 1980s the company had established a strong base in the West with eight facilities in BC, Alberta and Washington. A series of mergers and acquisitions throughout the 1990s put VersaCold on the continental and, by 2005, global map, as the purchase of P&O Cold Storage added operations in the US, Australia, New Zealand and Argentina.

In 2010, VersaCold sold its offshore operations and returned to its Canadian roots. VersaCold is jointly owned by Toronto-based private equity firm KingSett Capital and Quebec-based investor Ivanhoé Cambridge. Today, VersaCold operates the largest temperature-sensitive logistics network in Canada, with 27 temperature-controlled warehouses and distribution centres and a fleet of trucks providing local, regional, national and international transportation across Canada and the United States.

In August 2022, American multinational logistics chain Lineage announced its acquisition of VersaCold for an undisclosed sum.

== Services ==
VersaCold delivers a suite of fully integrated logistics services through its national network of facilities, transportation fleet and advanced technologies.
