= Foodstuffs (company) =

New Zealand retailers' cooperative

Foodstuffs (NZ) Ltd
- Foodstuffs NZ North Island (Foodies North Island) South Island
- Type: Subsidiary
- Industry: Retail
- Founded: 1922; 104 years ago
- Headquarters: Auckland, New Zealand - Foodstuffs North Island Christchurch, New Zealand - Foodstuffs South Island
- Revenue: Foodstuffs North Island ▲NZ$9.23 billion (2024); Foodstuffs South Island ▲NZ$3.63 billion (2024)
- Operating income: Foodstuffs North Island ▲NZ$286.94 million (2024); Foodstuffs South Island ▼NZ$1.94 million (2024)
- Net income: Foodstuffs North Island ▼NZ-$3.28 million (2024); Foodstuffs South Island ▼NZ-$11.54 million (2024)
- Total assets: Foodstuffs North Island ▲NZ$3.72 billion (2024); Foodstuffs South Island ▲NZ$1.45 billion (2024)
- Total equity: Foodstuffs North Island ▼NZ$1.07 billion (2024); Foodstuffs South Island ▼NZ$321.75 million (2024)
- Website: foodstuffs.co.nz (Foodstuffs North Island); foodstuffs-si.co.nz (Foodstuffs South Island)

Foodstuffs (NZ) Ltd is a New Zealand subsidiary owned by the retailers Foodstuffs North Island Limited and Foodstuffs South Island Limited. Together, the two companies collectively control an estimated 53% of the New Zealand grocery market. Foodstuffs NZ Ltd owns retail franchise banners Four Square, New World and Pak'nSave, Foodstuffs Own Brand Limited owns private labels Pams, Pam's Finest, and Pam's Value (formerly named Budget). Foodstuffs North Island and Foodstuffs South Island, although legally separate collectively operate over 400 retail stores as of 2020, and serves an estimated 3.6 million customers each week.

Foodstuffs North Island and Foodstuffs South Island's major competitor is the New Zealand division of the Australian Woolworths Group through their main supermarket chain Woolworths, creating an effective island duopoly in New Zealand's supermarket sector.

== History ==
The first Foodstuffs entity was formed in Auckland in 1922. On 6 July 1922, Foodstuffs founder J Heaton Barker called together members of the Auckland Master Grocers' Association to discuss plans for the formation of a co-operative buying group. The buying group expanded in 1925 with the introduction of Four Square branding on members' stores. Similar co-operative buying groups, were set up in other parts of the country, with Wellington commencing also in 1922, Christchurch in 1928 and Dunedin in 1948.

Foodstuffs NZ Limited began in 1933 as a wholesaler called Dominion Wholesalers Limited. The original owners are documented as Foodstuffs Limited (Auckland), United Buyers Limited (Wellington), Amalgamated Buyers Limited (Christchurch), changing its name in 1949 to Foodstuffs (NZ) Limited.

In 1996 the co-operatives act in New Zealand, came into effect which requires legal registration of co-operatives. From this time, Foodstuffs Wellington, and Foodstuffs South Island registered as a co-operative, and Foodstuffs Auckland maintained a Limited Share Company structure. Foodstuffs Auckland decision to maintain the Foodstuffs Perpetuation Trust, and Protection Trust represents a major barrier for it to be considered a co-operative legally under the current laws.

There have been strategic mergers between the groups, and until 2013 there were three companies: Foodstuffs (Auckland) Ltd; Foodstuffs (Wellington) Co-operative Society Ltd, and Foodstuffs South Island Ltd. Each operated independently and autonomously with its own board of directors, chief executive officer and management structure. There were no common members or shareholders. The organisation has undergone change, adopting supermarkets with the formation of the New World banner in 1963. The Pak'nSave banner began later, and the first store was opened in Kaitaia in 1985.

In 2006 Foodstuffs acquired a 10% stake in The Warehouse for $150 million. This was a time when The Warehouse was pushing to enter the grocery business. Later that year, Foodstuffs applied to the Commerce Commission to make an acquisition of The Warehouse in cooperation with Pacific Equity Partners. Foodstuff's stake in The Warehouse was later sold in 2021 for a loss.

On 7 February 2013, Foodstuffs (Auckland) Ltd and Foodstuffs (Wellington) Co-operative Society Ltd announced a planned merger, proceeding to merge without requesting regulatory approval, unlike the more recent 2023 merger clearance request. The merged Foodstuffs North Island entity, ceased to be registered as a co-operative, and started trading on 1 September 2013.

In September 2017 Foodstuffs announced that they had a goal to stop selling cage eggs by 2027. This followed an announcement by Countdown a few months prior that they would stop selling cage eggs by 2024. Foodstuffs' Pams brand has been cage free since 2008.

In August 2018 Foodstuffs announced that beginning on 1 January 2019, they would stop selling plastic bags within their stores. In 2022 Foodstuffs North Island announced that 29 of its North Island stores had started using facial recognition technology as a crime prevention measure.

In November 2023 Foodstuffs proposed to merge Foodstuffs North Island and Foodstuffs South Island into one entity. Foodstuffs argued that this would reduce costs due to a lack of duplication. However, the Commerce Commission blocked the merger in October 2024, stating that the buying power of the combined entity would be greater than what Foodstuffs North and South Island had individually, which would reduce competition and allow them to purchase from their suppliers at lower prices.

In February 2024 Foodstuffs North Island began trialling facial recognition technology, in use since 2022, in Pak'nSave and New World stores to detect people who have previously been trespassed. The Privacy Commissioner has expressed concerns about the technology's rate of false matches, which occurs higher in people of colour and women.

On 18 May 2026, Foodstuffs announced that it would be launching a new Club+ loyalty programme across its Pak'nSave, New World and Four Square supermarkets from 15 June 2026. The Club+ programme replaces these supermarket's separate loyalty programmes. The rollout of Club+ in mid-June 2026 was plagued by several problems including customers having trouble scanning the Club+ app on their phones at check-outs, delays in getting the verification code needed to set up the app, and discounts not appearing until the payment screen.

== Four Square ==
Four Square is a national banner of 225 small scale supermarkets that operate in both the North and South Islands entities. During the 1950s the Foodstuffs advertising department designed the famous "Mr 4 Square" who initially appeared only in newspaper advertising and posters, but was developed to become part of the Four Square identity, appearing in every Four Square store and eventually becoming a nationally recognised symbol in New Zealand, remaining famous to this day. The image is often closely associated with the art of New Zealand artist Dick Frizzell, who has used the iconic character in many of his works.

The name Four Square emerged when Mr Barker, while talking on the telephone to one of the buying group members on 4 July 1924, drew a square around the 4 of the date on his calendar. He immediately realised he had a suitable name for the buying group, stating that "they would stand 'Four Square' to all the winds that blew".

== New World ==
New World is a full-service supermarket franchise. Founded in 1963, New World was the first American-style full-service supermarket franchise brand. Foodstuffs NZ Ltd franchises the banner to the separate Foodstuffs entities, and it was the second full-service supermarket in New Zealand (after Foodtown). There is a total of 148 New World supermarkets across the North and South Islands entities in New Zealand (as of July 2023). New World stores tend to be smaller (2,500–3,000 square metres (27,000–32,000 sq ft)) and more upscale than their competitors. Prices tend to be higher in most stores, due to the cost of upscale presentation, large employee numbers (200–300 in some large stores), and often a lack of competition, especially in smaller towns. New World has been a member of the Fly Buys programme since the programme started in September 1996; Foodstuffs has a 25% stake in the Fly Buys company.

== Pak'nSave ==
Pak'nSave is a New Zealand discount supermarket banner, franchised by Foodstuffs NZ to Foodstuffs North Island and Foodstuffs South Island. Started in 1985, Pak'nSave is the most recent of the three current major New Zealand supermarket banners (Countdown, New World, and Pak'nSave) left. There are 58 Pak'nSave stores operating across the North and South Islands of New Zealand as of July 2023. Stores are large and have a no-frills environment, often with unlined interiors and concrete floors. Customers are left to pack their own bags or boxes.

The stores are supplied daily from their centralised island warehousing. Pak'nSave stores often buy stock in bulk. This process means that stores don't offer a wide variety of products as full-service supermarkets – a 2009 Consumer magazine survey noticed this especially in the pet food and toilet paper categories.

== On the Spot ==
On the Spot is a chain of 71 (as of July 2023) convenience stores/dairies in the South Island.

== LiquorLand ==
Foodstuffs operates a franchise of independently owned liquor stores: LiquorLand.

LiquorLand is run by Foodstuffs North Island and Foodstuffs South Island. It has 147 stores, including 45 Auckland stores. The chain sells a range of spirits, liqueurs, beer, wine, cider, ready-to-drinks and snack food, including confectionery.

Henry's Beer, Wine & Spirits was run by Foodstuffs South Island. These have now been rebranded to LiquorLand stores.

== Wholesalers ==
- Gilmours (part of Foodstuffs North Island).
- Trents (part of Foodstuffs South Island)

== Operations ==
Foodstuffs NZ is a subsidiary of Foodstuffs North Island and Foodstuffs South Island. Each entity has sought to become more vertically integrated, operating their own island distribution centres which supply their relevant stores per island.

== See also ==
- Supermarkets in New Zealand
