= New World (supermarket) =

New Zealand supermarket chain owned by Foodstuffs

- Type: Subsidiary
- Industry: Retail
- Founded: 1963; 63 years ago
- Headquarters: New Zealand
- Number of locations: 148
- Area served: New Zealand
- Products: Grocery stores; Supermarkets
- Brands: Pams, Pams Finest, Pams Superfood, Value
- Parent: Foodstuffs
- Website: newworld.co.nz

New World is a New Zealand full-service supermarket chain. Each store is independently owned and operated, and is part of one of two Foodstuffs' co-operatives. Other independently owned and operated members of the Foodstuffs co-operatives include Pak'nSave and Four Square stores.

== History ==
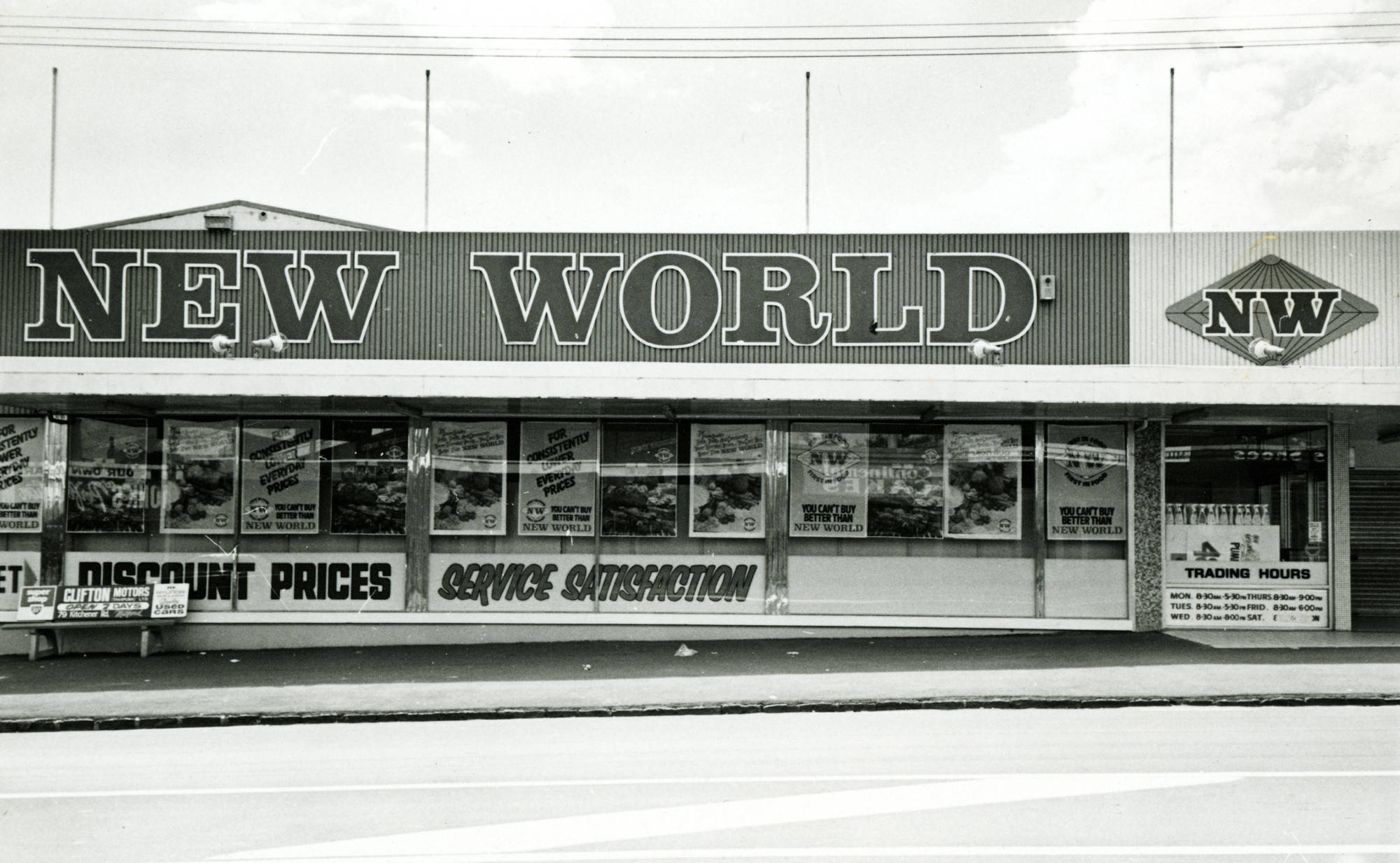
New World Milford in 1986

Founded in 1963, New World was the first American-style full-service supermarket brand of Foodstuffs, and the second in New Zealand (after Foodtown). As of December 2021, there are more than 140 New World supermarkets across the North and South Islands. New World was a member of the Fly Buys programme since it started in September 1996 until it ended in October 2024.

In early 2003 New World helped introduce Superbank, a completely electronic banking network aimed at saving customers money. While New World Supermarkets had much advertising for the service in their stores, Superbank had no physical services inside the store. In August 2006 it was announced that after heavy losses Superbank would be shut down and have its portfolio sold to GE Capital.

Historically, New World used a coupon saver system. This was replaced in 2014 in South Island stores by the Clubcard system; this was phased into North Island stores in 2016. In May 2026 Foodstuffs announced Club+, a replacement of Clubcard. The new Club+ is able to be used across all Foodstuffs brands (New World, Pak'n'Save and Four Square). Shoppers earn Club+ dollars at varying amounts across store which are able to be redeemed at any Foodstuffs store.

In mid June 2025, New World's Victoria Park supermarket in Auckland suffered extensive damage during a major fire. In response, New World announced that it would fast-track the opening of a new supermarket in Point Chevalier in mid August 2025. Due to fire damage, the Victoria Park site will be closed for two years. In early July 2025, New World's parent company Foodstuffs North Island and the Workers First Union confirmed that 180 Victoria Park staff would be laid off. Foodstuffs also said it was working with the owner-operator of its Victoria Park branch to help these employees find new jobs at its other stores and facilities in Auckland.

== Brands ==
=== New World ===
New World is the brand name of the chain's full-service supermarkets, selling groceries and liquor. The first store opened in 1963. There are 142 stores under this brand, including 26 in Auckland.

=== New World Metro ===
New World Metro is a brand of smaller supermarkets in central city locations, also selling groceries and liquor. The first store, in Wellington CBD, opened in 2002.

=== New World Fresh Collective ===
New World Fresh Collective is a brand of small supermarkets in Auckland, focusing on fresh produce, premium products and meal kits. The first store opened in Mairangi Bay in 2017, then others in Mount Albert and Glen Innes. Foodstuffs planned to open ten stores, but the Mount Albert store is the only one still operating until 2023, due to flooding, and in 2024, A New World in Mount Albert opened.

== Private label brands ==
New World has the house brand Pams, which has been around since 1937 – owned by parent company Foodstuffs and are also available across their retailer's cooperative.

== Promotions ==
In 2023, New World launched its fifth sticker promotion. During this, customers would receive a sticker upon spending $20, which could be exchanged for products, which in 2023, was Masterchef branded cookware.

== Gallery ==
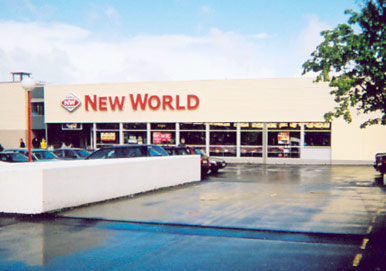
Centre City New World in Dunedin

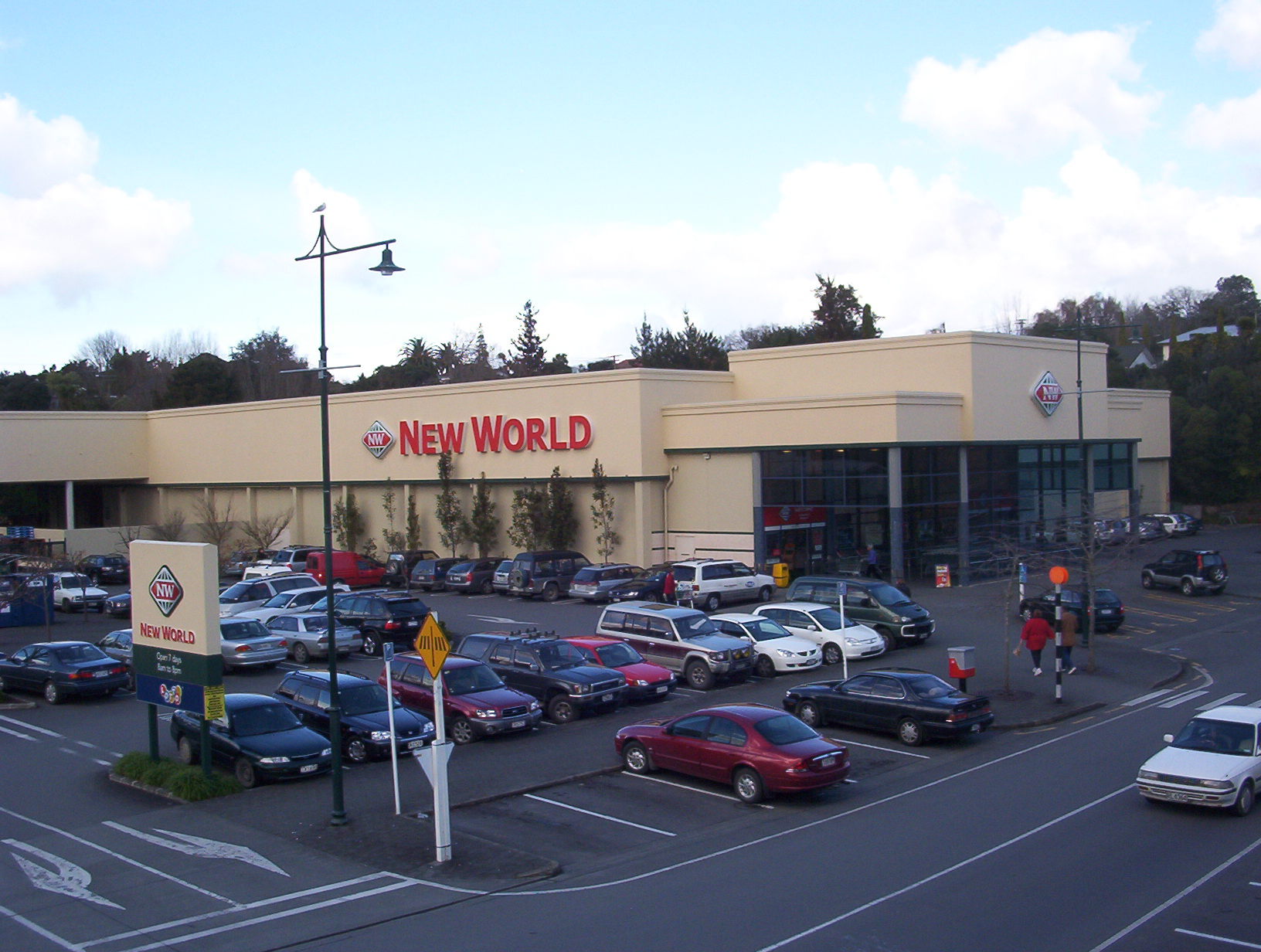
Warkworth New World

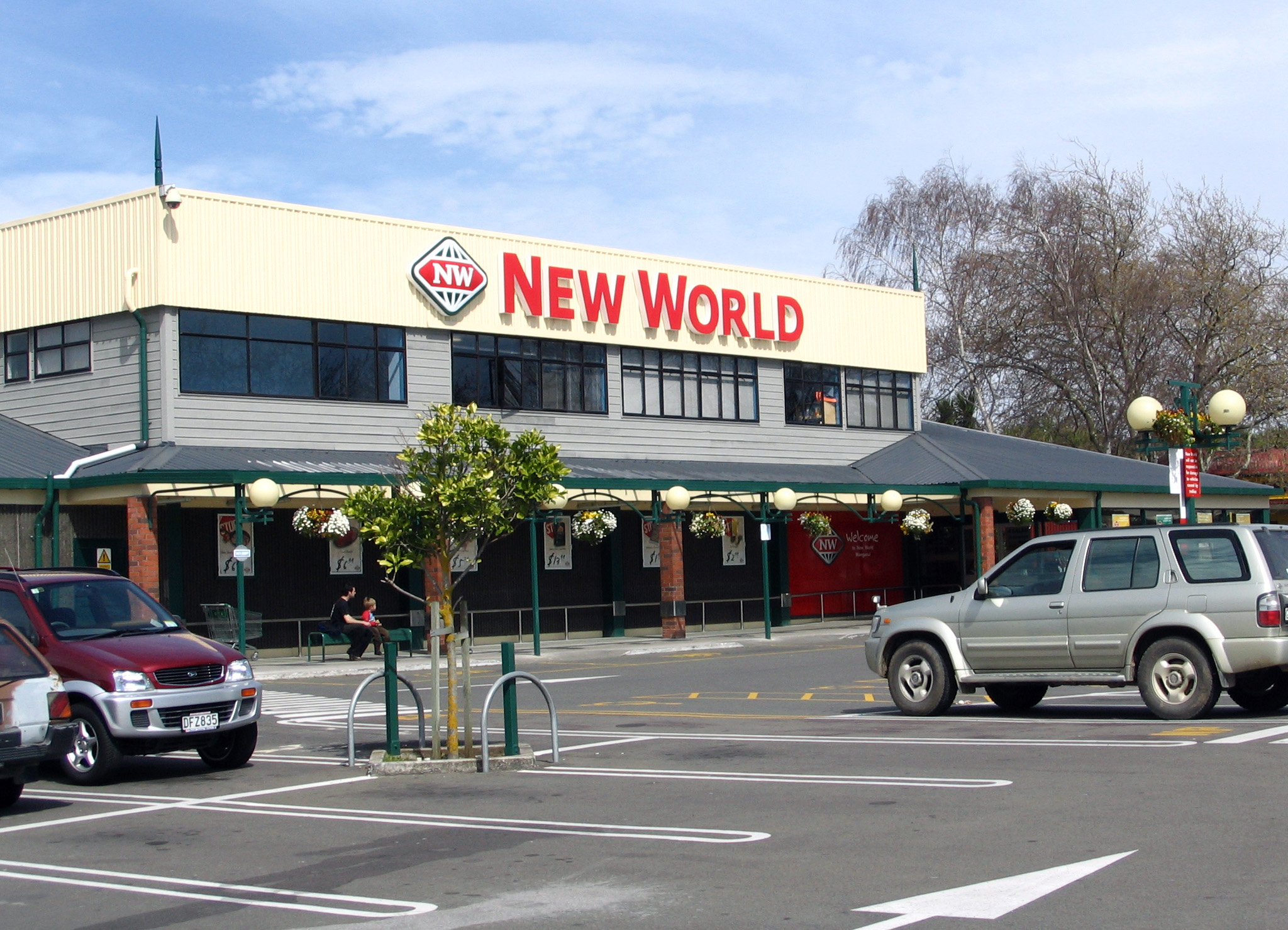
Whanganui New World

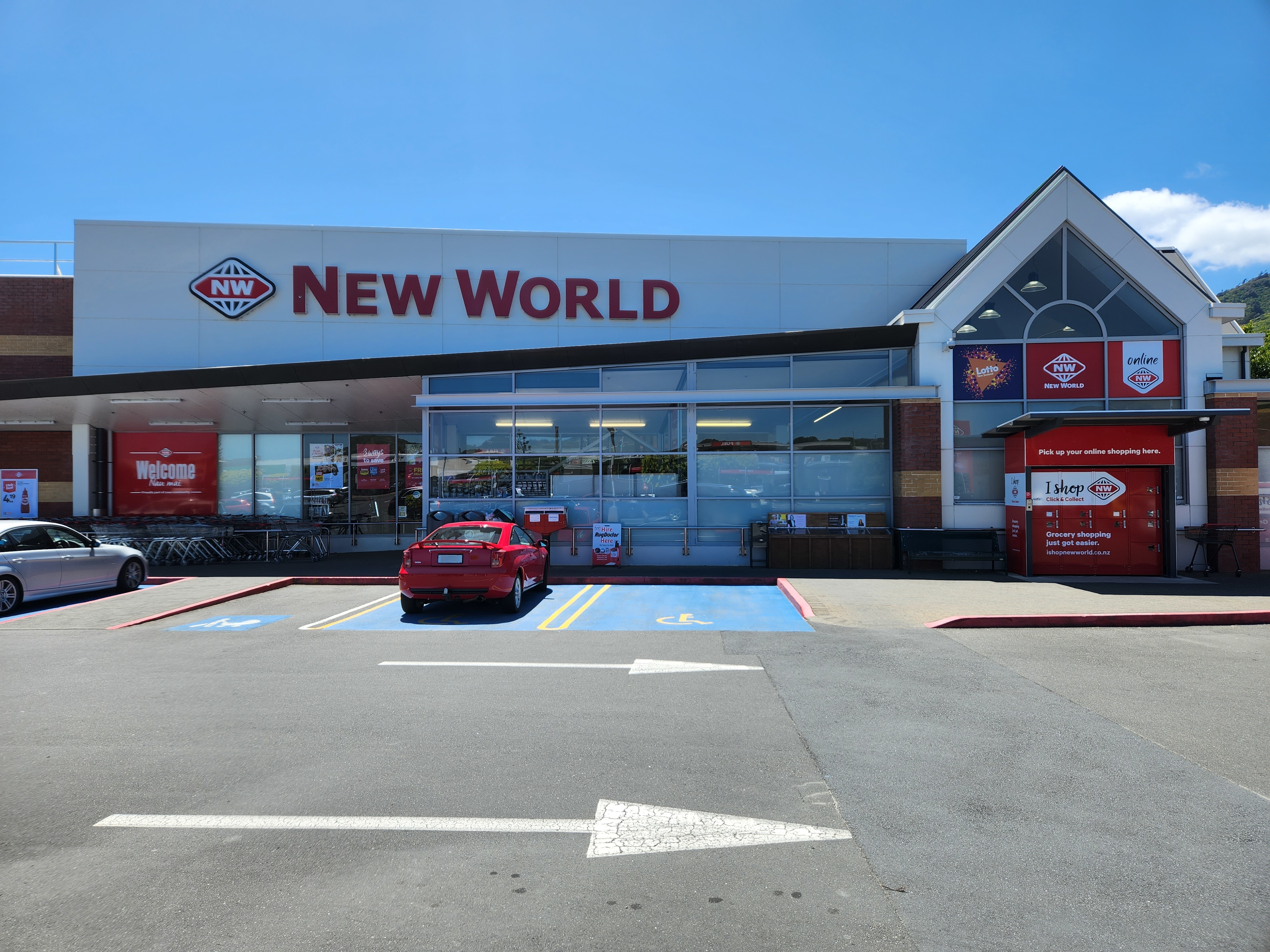
