= Pak'nSave =

New Zealand supermarket chain owned by Foodstuffs

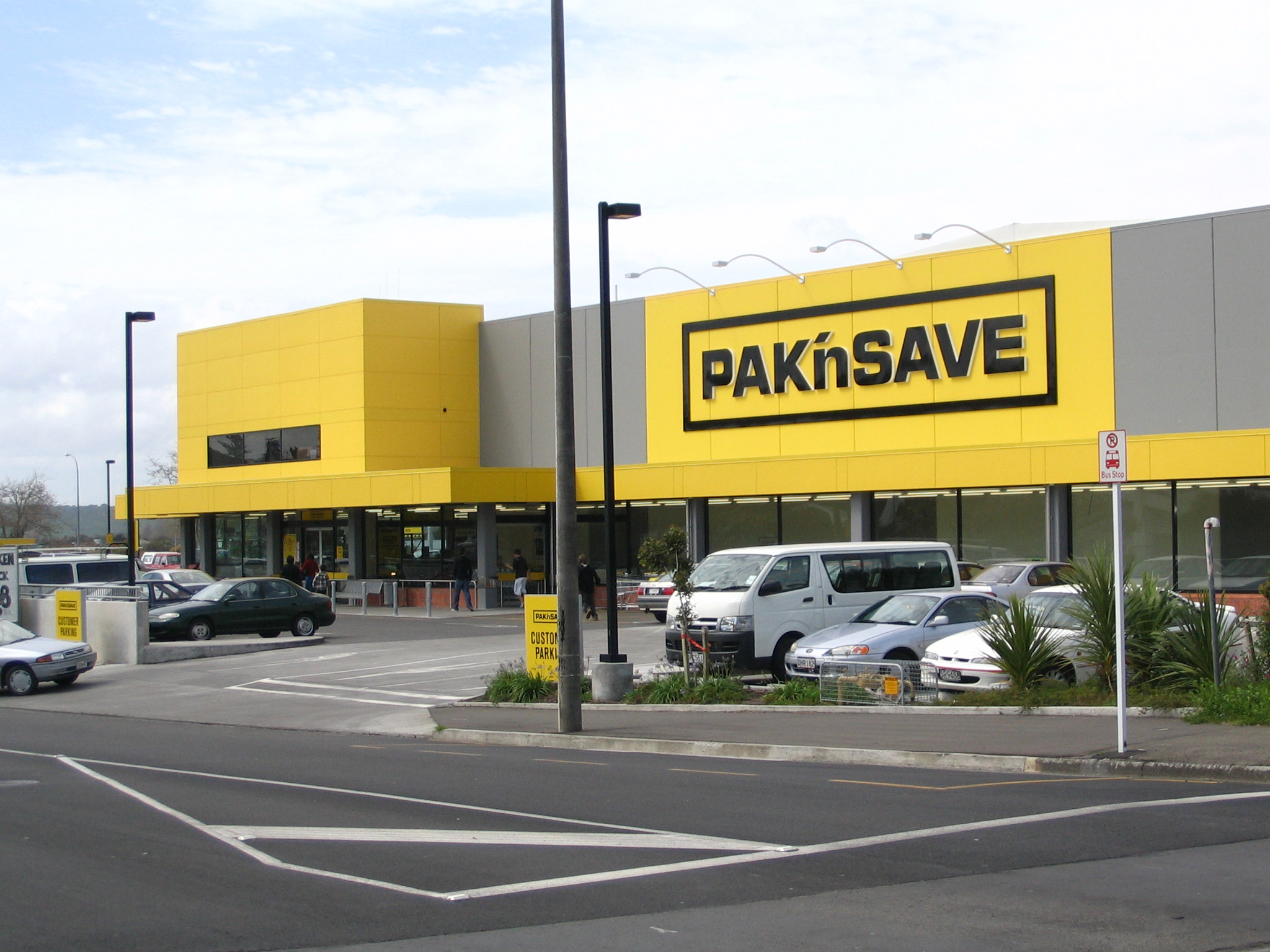
- Pak'nSave store in Whanganui
- Type: Private subsidiary
- Industry: Retail
- Founded: 12 June 1985; 41 years ago
- Headquarters: Auckland & Christchurch, New Zealand
- Number of locations: 60 stores (2026)
- Parent: Foodstuffs
- Website: www.paknsave.co.nz

Pak'nSave (stylised as PAK'nSAVE) is a New Zealand discount food supermarket chain owned by the Foodstuffs cooperative. It is one of the three main supermarket chains in New Zealand, alongside Woolworths and New World (the latter is also owned by Foodstuffs). There are a total of 60 Pak'nSave stores throughout the country.

Pak'nSave stores are large and have a no frills environment, often with unlined interiors and concrete floors.

== History ==
Pak'nSave had 20 stores in 1993, which rose to 30 stores in 1998. Its supermarket market share rose from 8% in 1989 to 24% in 1996.

=== Origins ===
The first Pak'nSave opened on 12 June 1985 in Kaitaia, a town in the Far North District of the North Island. In the beginning, mutton and candles were the stores best sellers, which is attributed to the fact that many homes in the Far North still did not have power in 1985. Pak'nSave originally used a system where customers were given a black marker upon entering the store, which would use this to write the prices onto the goods that they were buying, which they would bring to the checkouts. This is because Pak'nSave at the time did not use barcodes, scanners, or running checkouts, so prices were written onto shelves. Due to the first store's popularity in the Far North, Pak'nSave operated monthly bus trips to the Kaitaia store.

A couple of months after the first store, a second Pak'nSave store was opened in Henderson. Two days after the store opened, two more checkouts had to be opened because of its popularity.

=== 1990–2020 ===
In the 1992 recession, Pak'nSave increased its focus on prices.

In 2005, there were 37 stores around New Zealand, including seven in Auckland.

Pak'nSave started rolling out self checkouts around 2009, where customers would scan, pack and pay for their groceries themselves. Customers would only interact with employees to check IDs for sales of alcohol or cigarettes.

The first Pak'nSave store, in Kaitaia, went empty in 2011 because Foodstuffs opened a new store in Kaitaia. In 2018 Foodstuffs gave a 50-year lease for $2 to a Youth Centre. As the Youth Centre could not fulfill their plans, demolition of the building was announced in 2022.

Starting in 2017, the Energy Efficiency and Conservation Authority (EECA) provided funding toward Foodstuffs to trial electric delivery vans. Funding also went to electric car chargers for carparks.

In December 2017 Foodstuffs recalled a batch of its Pak'nSave branded beef mince after concerns that it contained soft plastic.

In August 2018 Pak'nSave announced that they would stop offering single-use plastic bags by the start of 2019. After they were discontinued, an 'endangered' bag sold on Trade Me for $52. In February 2020 Pak'nSave started trialling recycled paper bags for bulk food.

In January 2019 Pak'nSave announced that they would start rolling out the option to buy products online.

=== 2020–present ===
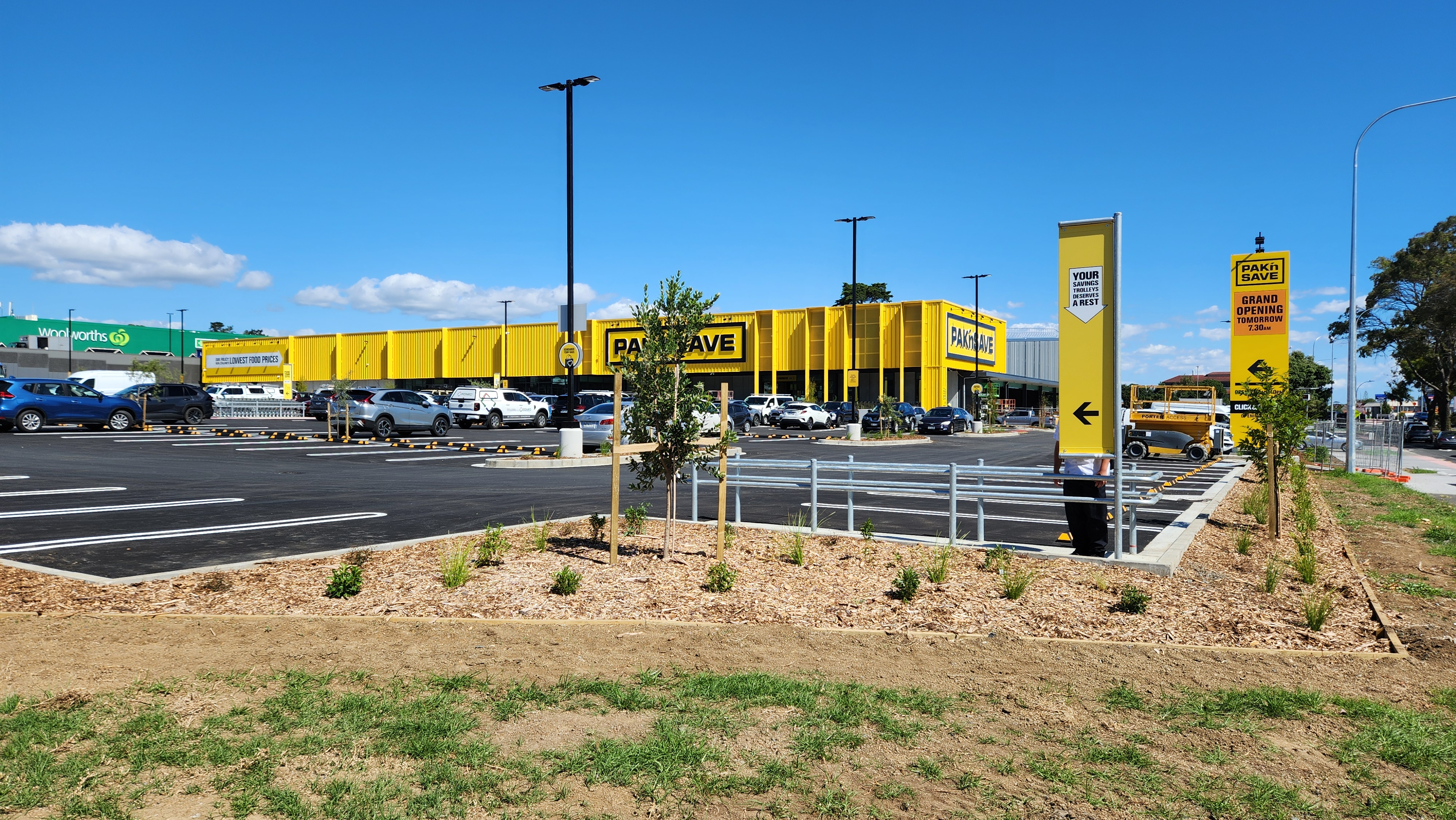
Pak'nSave store in Highland Park, Auckland

In October 2020, the Commerce Commission fined Pak'nSave Māngere $78,000 for making false and/or misleading representations of prices.

In May 2021, forty workers at Pak'nSave Lincoln Road, which was the largest supermarket in New Zealand, went on strike.

In September 2021, Foodstuffs announced Pak'nSave and New World would stop selling caged eggs by 2027.

In 2022, Foodstuffs announced that 29 of its North Island stores, including New World and Four Square, had started using facial recognition technology as a measure against crime.

During the 2023 Auckland Anniversary Weekend floods, the Pak'nSave Wairau Road had to close due to extensive flooding of the store.

In June 2023, Pak'nSave released an AI app named Savey Meal-bot. It creates meal plans and recipes from ingredients including leftovers given by the app's user. The app, made with the GPT-3 language model, sparked controversy when it suggested to a user to make chlorine gas and eat ant‑poison sandwiches.

In June 2023, a Pak'nSave in Tauranga started trialling front-facing body cameras due to a rise in retail crime.

In 2023, Pak'nSave was named New Zealand's most trusted brand in a Reader's Digest survey. Pak'nSave had held the title for twelve years in a row, out of the survey's 24-year history.

== Operations ==
Pak'nSave is franchised.

Extra products that are not on shelves are stacked above the shelves on the pallets they were delivered in, meaning that the floor space can be used for retail and storage. The stores are supplied daily from their co-operative distributor Foodstuffs.

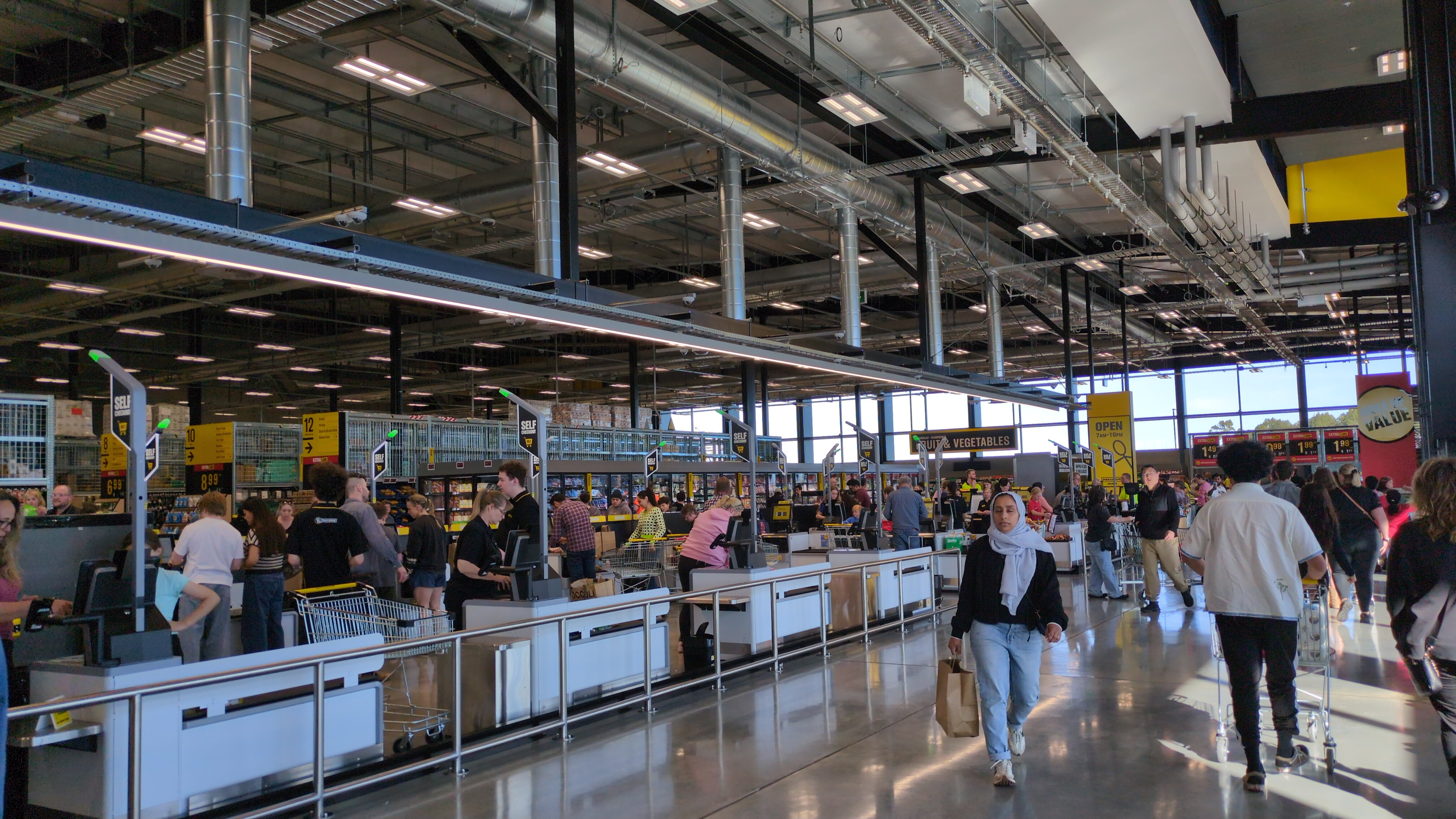
Self checkout area at Pak'nSave Rolleston in 2025

Most stores have self checkout and some have self scanning facilities where customers scan and bag their own groceries, with several self-checkouts monitored over by a single staff member for assistance and to clear any restricted transactions (e.g. alcohol). Pak'nSave has self-scanning facilities (Shop n' Go) where pre-registered customers can scan items with a hand-held scanner (PS20) while shopping in store.

=== Pak'nSave Mini ===
On 13 September 2017, Levin's Write Price supermarket was re-branded as Pak'nSave Mini. Pak'nSave Mini is a small format store that stocks around 2,500 products. In comparison, standard Pak'nSave stores stock approximately 8,000 products.

=== Competition ===
Pak'nSave's main competitors are Woolworths and the also Foodstuffs-owned New World.

=== Shop'nGo ===
Shop'nGo is a service where customers are given scanners, which are used to scan products as they shop around the store, which allows them to track the total price. Customers using Shop'nGo do not need to unload their trolley to pay. They go to a self-checkout, scan a QR on the Shop'nGo screen, and then pay for the products.

Shop'nGo started around 2005 in a few stores. In 2020, 11 stores in the South Island rolled out Shop'nGo.

== Marketing ==
Pak'nSave is well known for its "cut price" television and print adverts utilising a stick figure, named "Stickman", in black on a yellow background (occasionally, the colour scheme is reversed, including during the 2011 Rugby World Cup and the 2012 Summer Olympics). The television adverts are voiced by comedian Paul Ego. Originally, the voice of Stickman was Ego "mucking around". Another voice had been recorded but it was the "mucking around" voice which was chosen.

In April 2020, during the COVID-19 pandemic, an Instagram account was created for Stickman. His first post was "Day 1 on Instagram and Day 23 in Lockdown. My bubble is still looking fresh. Just jokes, that's my head. #gotyou". The account has 25,000 followers. In September Pak'nSave took down an advertisement which pronounced the Māori word Wainoni incorrectly.

In 2011, the Stickman adverts were one of the finalists for Best Ad in the annual Fair Go Ad Awards, but lost to the New Zealand Lotteries Commission's "Wilson the Dog" adverts.

In December 2022, under the stage name DJ Save-A-LotT, Stickman hosted an hour-long radio show.

== Fuel discounts ==
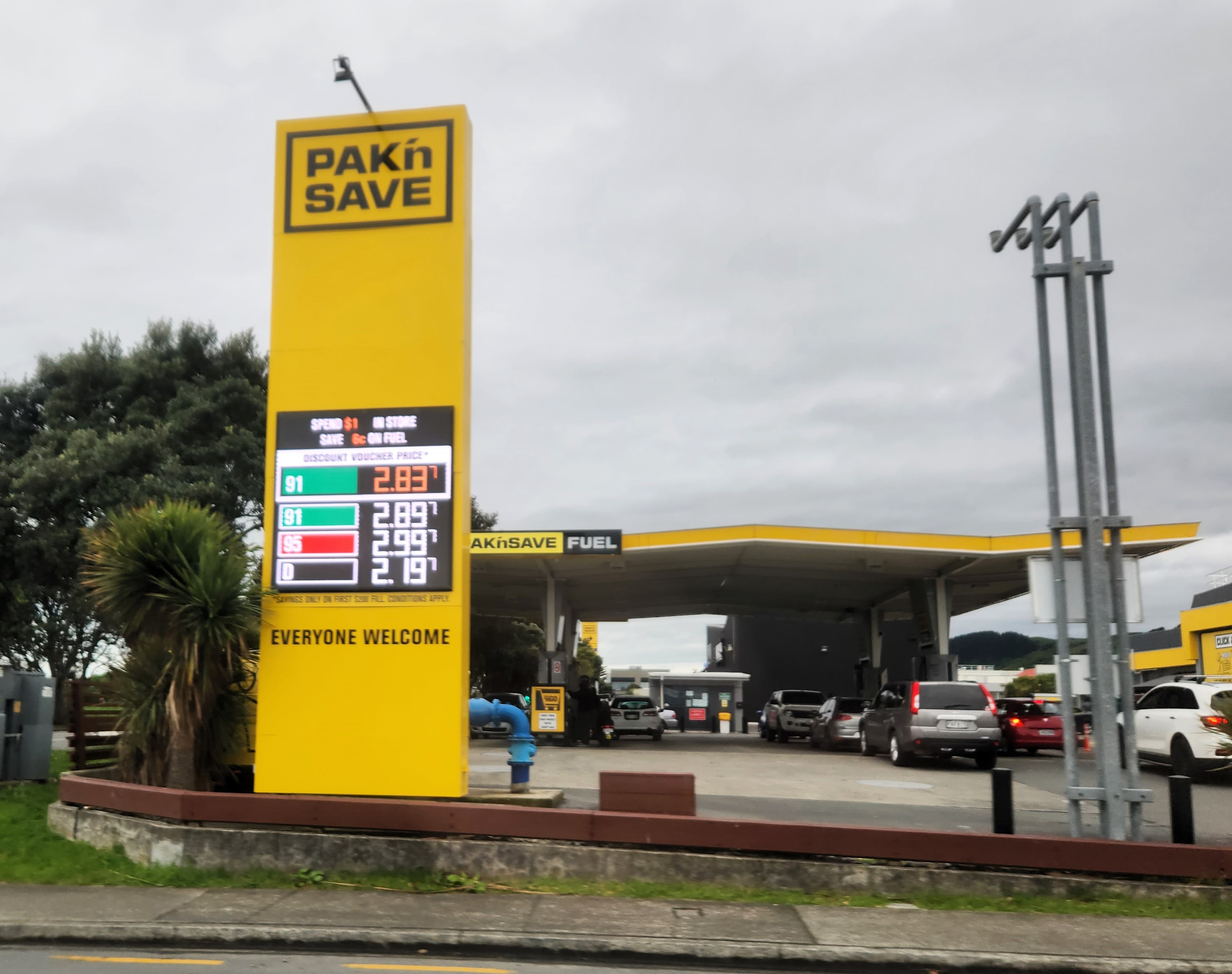
Pak'nSave Fuel in Paraparaumu

Pak'nSave offers a program which gives customers a fuel discount for stores with on-site fuel filling stations. To do this, customers scan a "Sticky Club" tag at the checkout and receive a voucher. Stores without on-site Pak'nSave fuel filling stations offer vouchers for use at Z Energy service stations.

=== Fuel sites ===
In December 2002, the first Pak'nSave Fuel site was opened at the Pak'nSave in Tamatea. It was originally owned by BP New Zealand and Foodstuffs. More fuel sites were opened in more PAK'nSAVE stores and New World joined for the fuel sites later. In 2018, Z Energy won Mobil's contract to operate the fuel sites and fuel vouchers.

== Controversies ==
In 2013 the Commerce Commission said that Pak'nSave's comparative pricing advertisements may be misleading under certain circumstances.

In 2018 Progressive Enterprises, the owner of Countdown, complained to the Advertising Standards Authority (ASA) about a Pak'nSave advertisement. It compared prices between Pak'nSave and Countdown. Progressive said that the advertisement was misleading as no store had the same prices on the day listed in the advertisement. Foodstuffs said that there was a mistake in the date, and said that rather than 7 August 2017, the correct date was 28 September 2017. The same year, vegans complained to the Advertising Standards Authority that an advertisement saying "you'll never beat real meat" is offensive to the vegan and vegetarian community. The ASA dismissed the complaint. Again in 2018, a Pak'nSave advertisement encouraging responsible drinking was described by the Human Rights Commission as "discriminatory and harmful". It featured men dressed as women purchasing wine, causing human rights advocates to describe the ad as "transphobic".

In October 2020, the Commerce Commission fined Pak'nSave Māngere $78,000 for making false and/or misleading representations of prices.

In June 2023, Pak'nSave released an AI app named Savey Meal-bot. It creates meal plans and recipes from ingredients including leftovers given by the app's user. The app, made with the GPT-3 language model, sparked controversy when it suggested to a user to make chlorine gas and eat ant-poison sandwiches.

== Fundraising and charity ==
In early 2023 Pak'nSave owner operators from across the North Island donated over $575,000 to help communities affected by Cyclone Gabrielle.

Pak'nSave stores donated the equivalent of 2.5 million meals in 2019 to those who needed them the most. The first ever Pak'canSAVE appeal saw nearly 80,000 cans donated to local food banks by generous customers, with Pak'nSave donating $200,000.

In November 2015, Pak'nSave stores participated in the annual Movember fundraising effort, raising NZ$106,000 for Movember New Zealand. This was the largest sum ever raised by a New Zealand company for the charity.

== Consumer perceptions ==
A 2021 study by the Commerce Commission found that consumers consider Pak'nSave, compared to other supermarkets, as more inexpensive with poorer quality meats and vegetables.

== See also ==
- Supermarkets in New Zealand
