= Four Square (supermarket) =

New Zealand supermarket chain part of Foodstuffs

- North Island South Island

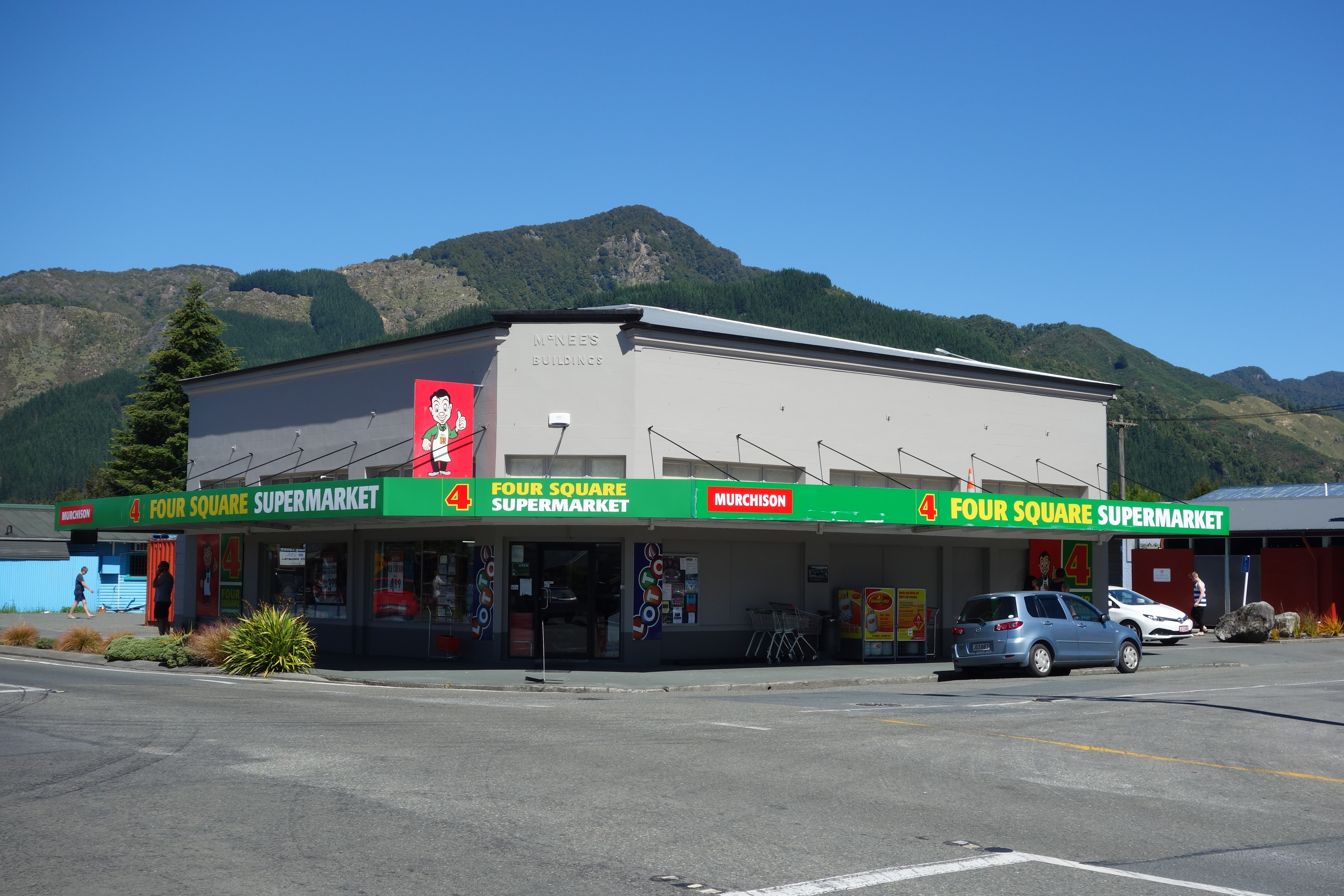
- Four Square supermarket in Murchison
- Type: Subsidiary
- Founded: 1924; 102 years ago
- Headquarters: Auckland, New Zealand
- Number of locations: 224
- Parent: Foodstuffs
- Website: foursquare.co.nz

Four Square is a chain of supermarkets in New Zealand that was founded by John Heaton Barker. It has 225 stores throughout New Zealand, mostly in small towns. Some Four Square supermarkets previously operated in Australia under the name Friendly Grocer.

== History ==
The first Four Square, the first supermarket in New Zealand, opened in the 1920s.

Four Square emerged as a household name in the 1920s out of the Foodstuffs grocery buying co-operative, whose founder, John Heaton Barker, became concerned at the manner in which the activities of the grocery chain stores of the day were making life difficult for independent grocers in Auckland. On 6 July 1922, Heaton Barker called together members of the Auckland Master Grocers Association and discussed their plans for forming a cooperative buying group of independent grocers. On 1 April 1925, this buying group registered a company called Foodstuffs Ltd, which was the first of three regional cooperatives based in Auckland, Wellington and Christchurch.

The name Four Square emerged when Heaton Barker, while talking on the telephone to one of the buying group members on 4 July 1924, drew a square around the 4 of the date on his calendar. He considered this to be a suitable name for the buying group, stating that "they would stand ’Four Square’ to all the winds that blew".

By the end of 1924 products were appearing under the Four Square name, and by 1929 discussions were underway on the use of a common branding on stores. Early versions of the Four Square sign were produced in the form of red and gold hand painted glass panels for display in members’ stores. The "Mr 4 Square" symbol, also known as "Cheeky Charlie", was developed in the 1950s. The image is associated with the art of New Zealand artist Dick Frizzell, who has used the iconic character in many of his works.

In February 1948 first self-service Four Square was opened, in Onehunga, Auckland.

== Stores ==
There are 165 Four Square stores on the North Island, including 23 in Northland, 21 in Auckland, six on the Coromandel Peninsula, 18 in the rest of the Waikato Region, 20 in Bay of Plenty, 5 in the Gisborne District, 15 in the Hawke's Bay Region, 15 in Taranaki, 20 in Manawatū-Whanganui and 19 in the Wellington Region. There are 60 Four Square stores on the South Island and Stewart Island, including six in Nelson and Tasman, three in Marlborough, four on the West Coast, 16 in Canterbury, 18 in Otago and 12 in Southland.

== Marketing ==
=== Four Square Man ===
The Four Square Man, also known as Cheeky Charlie or Mr. 4, is the mascot of Four Square. It was created in the 1950s by the advertising department of Foodstuffs.

Ernest Cox, a prominent sign writer and graphic designer who worked for Foodstuffs, made the initial designs for Cheeky Charlie. Ernest owned and operated an art school and art shop and was a well known advertising artist in the 1940s to 1960s in New Zealand designing for many well known logos including Mr 4 Square. Initially only appearing in newspapers and posters, Cheeky Charlie later made appearances in every Four Square store.

Since the 1980s, the Four Square Man has been designed by Dick Frizzell. He did photo essays about various objects and shops, such as his local butcher, baker, panel beater, and the Four Square in Kingsland. Frizzell made billboards with him as the Four Square Man, which lead Foodstuffs to contact him with intellectual property concerns. Foodstuffs later commissioned Frizzel to paint the character, and he would receive a copyright commission despite the fact that Frizzell did not invent the character.
