= Kiwiana =

Certain items and icons from New Zealand's heritage

Kiwiana is an expression common among New Zealanders referring to certain items and icons from New Zealand's heritage, especially from around the middle of the 20th century, that are seen as representing iconic New Zealand elements. These "quirky things that contribute to a sense of nationhood" include both genuine cultural icons and kitsch.

== Origins and history ==
The silver fern flag has become an iconic, yet unofficial, symbol of New Zealand.

The term Kiwiana comes from a combination of Kiwi, a nickname for New Zealanders, and Americana, defined as items that showcase American culture. Items of Kiwiana are generally either unique or particularly common to New Zealand, particularly from the early and mid-twentieth century. Although the term is sometimes used to describe any and all New Zealand icons, it is more commonly used to describe pop culture items such as toys or branded foods. A few more serious national icons have become Kiwiana through heavy use in advertising and the souvenir industry, including the kiwi and the hei-tiki. Kiwiana is generally seen as a form of kitsch.

A number of companies with products deemed to be 'Kiwiana' have enthusiastically cashed in on this. For example, an advertising campaign has claimed that "you'll never be a Kiwi 'til you love your Wattie's sauce", even though the company is now American-owned. In the 1990s, a Sanitarium campaign claimed that "Kiwi kids are Weet-Bix kids". The advertisement was a dubbed version of an Australian advertisement that claimed that 'Aussie kids are Weet-bix kids' and the landscape in the background of the advertisement is recognisably Australian. Other companies have attempted to create their own Kiwiana. For example, McDonald's New Zealand has an off and on 'Kiwiburger' sold within their stores, which was an attempt to duplicate the traditional New Zealand style of burger with a slice of beetroot and a fried egg, and its advertisement was essentially a sung list of Kiwiana items. A series of L&P commercials, featuring Jemaine Clement of Flight of the Conchords, are based around Kiwiana-themed items, and were very popular with New Zealanders. A number of products widely regarded as Kiwiana, such as Wattie's tomato sauce, Marmite, and L&P, are now made by non-New Zealand companies. In some cases, this is because the original New Zealand company has been purchased by an overseas corporation, in others the product has always been made by an international firm.

In recent decades, Kiwiana has become a subject in itself, and several celebratory books have been published. A range of products using Kiwiana motifs has also been produced, including Christmas tree decorations, cards, T-shirts, garden ornaments and jewellery. There are Kiwiana sections in many New Zealand museums, and some are dedicated to showing Kiwiana only. In 1994, New Zealand Post released a set of stamps depicting kiwiana items including a pavlova, fish and chips, rugby boots and ball, and a black singlet and gumboots.

== Well-known examples ==
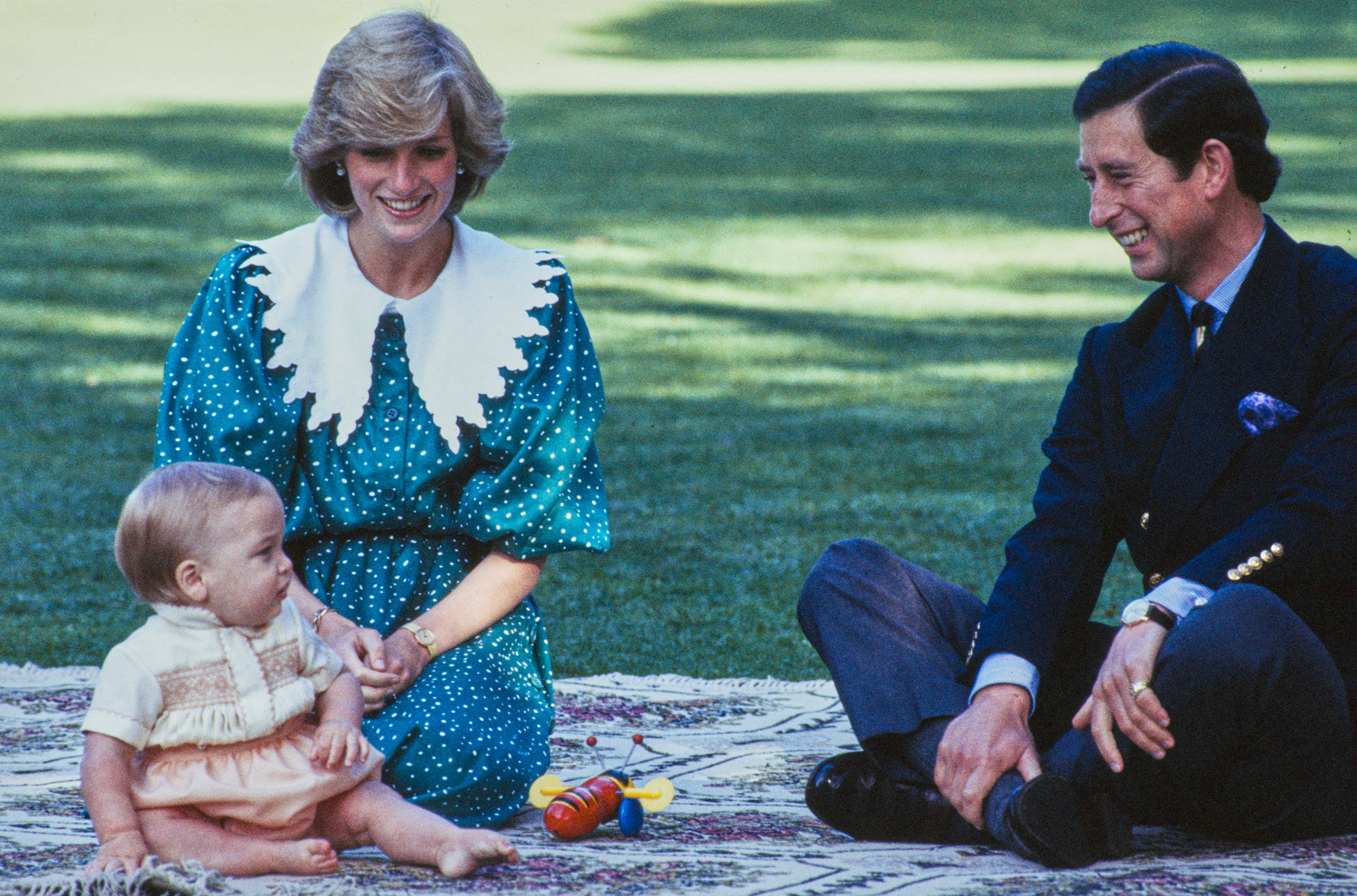
William, Prince of Wales, playing with a Buzzy Bee toy in 1983

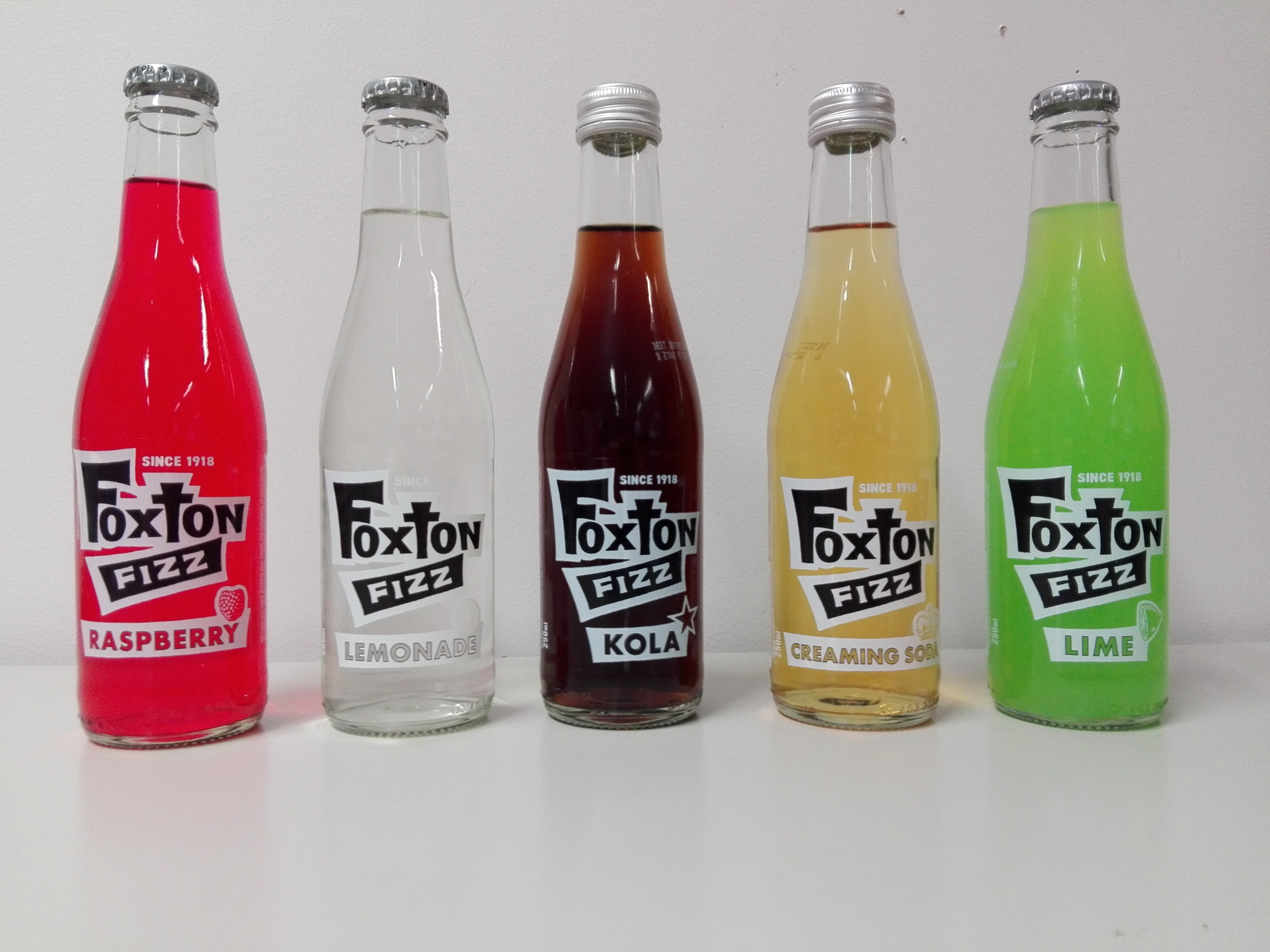
Foxton Fizz

=== Arts and media ===
- Footrot Flats — a popular comic strip by Murray Ball.
- Goodnight Kiwi — animated short used to signify the end of nightly broadcasts on Television New Zealand channels.
- Hairy Maclary and Friends — a series of children's picture books that became a major bestseller.
- Mrs. Wishy-Washy — a series of children's picture books that became a major bestseller.
- Legend (Ghost Chips) advert — an anti-drink driving advert broadcast in 2011, directed by Steve Ayson.
- "Poi E" — a popular song by New Zealand group Pātea Māori Club that reached Number 1 on the New Zealand music charts in 1984.
- "Slice of Heaven" — a popular song by New Zealand musician Dave Dobbyn that reached Number 1 on the New Zealand music charts in 1986.
- The Dunedin Sound - a musical and cultural scene in the 1980s Dunedin that was the bedrock of modern indie rock.
- Flying Nun - an iconic independent record label whose roster included various Dunedin Sound artists, such as The Chills, The Clean, The Verlaines, Straitjacket Fits, Able Tasmans, The Bats, and The 3Ds, and acts influenced by them such as Pavement, Aldous Harding, Fazerdaze and The Mint Chicks.
- The Wonky Donkey — a popular children's book that was also adapted into a song by Craig Smith.
- Toyota "bugger" advert — in which the Toyota Hilux's unexpected power causes several unintended consequences, each capped with the interjection "bugger" as a punchline.

=== Businesses ===
- Air New Zealand — the national flag airline.
- Bluebird Foods — manufacturer of snack foods, cereals and muesli bars.
- Fisher & Paykel — major appliance manufacturer that has grown into a global company.
- Four Square supermarkets — especially Mr. Four Square, the marketing logo.
- Griffin's Foods — manufacturer of biscuits, snacks and confectionery.
- The Warehouse Group — the largest retail group in New Zealand that includes The Warehouse.

=== Fashion ===
- Canterbury — sports clothing company that mainly focuses on rugby, the country's national sport.
- Gumboots — calf-length rubber boots, usually in black.
- Kozmik — brand of clothing popular in the late 1980s and early 1990s characterised by its bright colours.
- Jandals — beach footwear with a bit of sole but very little else. Also known as flip-flops (UK and USA) and thongs (Australia).
- Red Bands — a particular brand of gumboots made by Skellerup.
- Swanndri — a 100% waterproof woollen overcoat. Popular amongst farmers due to it being 'warm in winter, cool in summer'. Typically made in a tartan or patch work pattern. Often blue and black, or red and black in colour. Often worn in conjunction with Gumboots and/or Stubbies. Also known as a "lammie" in some parts of the South Island, notably the West Coast Region.

=== Food and drink ===
- Afghan biscuit — a chocolate biscuit with a soft biscuit base (containing cornflakes, Weet-Bix or rolled oats for texture), chocolate icing, and a walnut on top.
- Anzac biscuit — a biscuit popular in Australia and New Zealand, made from rolled oats, flour, sugar, butter, golden syrup, baking soda and boiling water, popularised during World War 1.
- Black Knight — popular brand of black liquorice.
- Buzz Bars — a confection of marshmallow topped with caramel and chocolate-covered.
- Chesdale — brand of cheese chiefly known for its advertising characters Ches and Dale.
- Chilly bin — an insulated box used to keep food and drink cool. Also known as a cooler, portable ice chest, icebox, cool box (UK and USA) and esky (Australia).
- Chocolate fish — a confection of marshmallow covered in chocolate, in the shape of a fish.
- Cookie Time cookies — a large chocolate chip cookie often sold individually and frequently heated up before being consumed.
- DB Draught — beer that is one of the best-selling in New Zealand.
- DB Export Gold — beer associated with DB Draught and within the same company. Rising to be one of New Zealand's best selling beers.
- Edmonds Cookery Book — a popular cookbook featuring many traditional New Zealand recipes.
- Fish and chips — a culinary staple of New Zealand.
- Foxton Fizz — retro brand of soft drink from Foxton. Dates back to 1918. Was originally distributed in Foxton and as far south as Ōtaki, and north to Sanson. In 2010 it began enjoying a resurgence in popular cafes and some bars.
- Fruit Bursts — a popular New Zealand confectionery item produced by Pascall.
- Georgie Pie — former fast food chain specialising in meat pies.
- Hāngī — method of cooking using heated rocks buried underground in a pit oven.
- Hokey pokey ice-cream — vanilla ice cream with added small round lumps of hokey pokey (known elsewhere as honeycomb) toffee.
- Jaffas — a small round lolly consisting of a solid, orange flavoured chocolate centre with a hard covering of red coloured confectionery.
- Kiwiburger — a hamburger sold at McDonald's restaurants in New Zealand consisting of a four-ounce (113 g) beef patty, griddle egg, beetroot, tomato, lettuce, cheese, onions, mustard and ketchup on a toasted bun.
- Kiwifruit — fruit from a vine originating in China but selectively bred by New Zealand horticulturalists to obtain egg-sized fruit with green or gold flesh. In New Zealand it was originally called "Chinese gooseberry".
- Kiwi onion dip — a dipping sauce common in New Zealand.
- Lemon & Paeroa — also known as L&P, a popular soft drink whose slogan is "World Famous in New Zealand since ages ago".
- Lion Red — a lager-style beer that is the most popular beer in New Zealand.
- The Longest Drink In Town — since 1968, this iconic blue and red giraffe image has appeared on the side of paper cups used by dairies, bakeries and icecream parlours for milkshakes.
- Lolly cake — a popular dessert made of crushed malt biscuits, diced Explorers or Fruit Puffs, butter, condensed milk, and coconut rolled up into a log and sliced.
- Mainland — brand of cheese sold throughout Australasia and parts of the Americas.
- Marmite — a New Zealand-made dark and salty spread made from yeast extract, similar to the Marmite from the UK, but produced by Australian-New Zealand company Sanitarium.
- Moro — chocolate bar that is caramel and nougat layered.
- Pascall K-Bars — brand of fruit toffee bars.
- Pavlova — a meringue dessert topped with whipped cream and fruit.
- Pinky — chocolate bar produced by Cadbury, that has pink marshmallow and topped with caramel.
- Pineapple lumps — confectionery made with a pineapple flavoured centre covered in chocolate, produced by Pascall.
- Snifters — lolly that has a hard outer shell with a mint chocolate centre.
- Sparkles — lolly that comes in orange and raspberry varieties.
- Spaceman Candy Sticks — stick-shaped lolly.
- Speight's Gold Medal Ale — beer that is one of the best-selling in New Zealand.
- Sunday roast — a dinner time staple in New Zealand.
- Tangy Fruits — small edible fruit flavoured round candies, often sold at movie theatres.
- Tip Top — a popular New Zealand ice cream brand.
- Tui — a popular New Zealand beer formerly produced out of the Tui Brewery in Mangatainoka. Famous for the "Yeah, right" ad campaigns.
- V — energy drink that makes up 60% of New Zealand's market share.
- Wattie's — a brand of tomato sauce (especially when served in a plastic container shaped like a tomato). Produced in Hawke's Bay with related shares to Kraft Heinz American company.
- Wests — an old-style soft drink from Dunedin, known for its quirky flavours.
- Weet-Bix — a wheat-like biscuit often served with milk and fruits. Produced by Sanitarium.
- Whittaker's — a popular chocolate company from Porirua.

=== Māoritanga ===
- Haka — traditional Māori war dance, now widely used as a challenge by sports teams.
- Hei-tiki — Māori neck pendant, often in plastic versions sold to tourists.
- Koru — a spiral pattern often used in art.
- Pāua — the polished shell of the native pāua (abalone) shellfish, especially as jewellery, or ashtrays.
- Pounamu — a green stone highly valued by the Māori. Also known as greenstone.
- Tā moko — Māori facial tattoos.

=== Sports ===
- All Blacks — national Rugby Union team. Other sports teams have nicknames based on the All Black name, such as the Tall Blacks (national men's basketball team).
- Black Ferns — national women's Rugby Union team. Other women's teams are named similarly such as the Silver Ferns (national netball team) or Tall Ferns (national women's basketball team).
- New Zealand Warriors — national Rugby League team competing in the NRL, nicknamed the Wahs.
- Rugby union — known simply as rugby, the country's national sport.
- The black singlet — a distinctive dark top worn by New Zealand athletes in international competition.
- Cardigan Bay — a famous racehorse from New Zealand, who was the first trotter to win a million US dollars.
- Phar Lap — a horse from New Zealand, who won many prestigious races in Australia and North America.
- Silver fern — native plant; its stylised image or shape is displayed on army insignia and by many of the national sports teams.

=== Tourism ===
- 100% Pure New Zealand — marketing tool for Tourism New Zealand which aims to showcase the range of unique experiences on offer in New Zealand.
- Bungy jumping — an adventure sport commercialised in New Zealand.

=== Toys ===
- Buzzy Bee — wooden children's toy.

=== Wildlife ===
- Kiwi — native bird; its stylised image or shape frequently appears on things associated with New Zealand.
- Tūī — native bird; common garden bird found throughout the country.
- Moa — extinct bird; a large rebuilt fossil remains in Te Papa.

=== Other ===
- Bach (or crib) — a small holiday home.
- Number 8 wire — a gauge of wire often used inventively and practically for applications other than for fencing. It is also used as a term that epitomises the "kiwi bloke" as someone who can turn their hand to anything.
- Railway crockery — a typically heavy style of crockery made by Crown Lynn and used in the state railway system.
- Southern man — male farmer, hunter or bushman hailing from the deep rural southern regions of Otago and Southland. Popularised in especially in Otago rugby and reflected in the song "Southern Man" by Denis Henderson
- World famous in New Zealand — a self-deprecating phrase first used in advertisements for Lemon and Paeroa drink, meaning things that are good and which would be well-known internationally if they were from a larger country.

== See also ==
- National symbols of New Zealand
- Canadiana — a similar concept in Canada
- Americana — a similar concept in the United States
- Australiana — a similar concept in Australia
- Rhodesiana — a similar concept in Zimbabwe relating to items made in its colonial (Rhodesia) era
