= Ah Chee =

Ah Chee is a surname. One origin is derived from a Chinese personal name, consisting of the familiar prefix Ah (阿) and any given name romanised as Chee.

Notable people with the surname include:

- Brendon Ah Chee (born 1993), Australian rules footballer
- Callum Ah Chee (born 1997), Australian rules footballer, brother of Brendon
- Chan Ah Chee (1851–1930), Chinese-born New Zealand businessman
- Loh Ah Chee (1922–1997), Singaporean sports shooter
- Myra Ah Chee (born 1932), Aboriginal Australian writer
- Tom Ah Chee (1928–2000), New Zealand businessman, grandson of Chan

== See also ==
- Vernon Ah Kee (born 1967), Australian artist
