= Tangy =

Tangy may refer to:

- Having a sour or pungent taste
- Tangy Fruits, a New Zealand candy
- Tangy Loch, Kintyre, Scotland
- Tangy Wind Farm, see List of onshore wind farms in the United Kingdom
