= Wishy-washy =

Wishy-washy or Wishy Washy may refer to:

- Mrs. Wishy-Washy, a children's book character created by New Zealand author Joy Cowley
- Wishy Washy, a son of Widow Twankey in the pantomime Aladdin
- "Wishy-washy", a 2nd season episode of Lilo & Stitch: The Series - see List of Lilo & Stitch: The Series episodes
- "Wishy Washy", a 3rd season episode of Timon & Pumbaa - see List of Timon & Pumbaa episodes
- "Wishy Washy", a track from the 1980 debut album INXS (album) by Australian rock band INXS
- "Wishy Washy", a track from the 2014 mixtape Rich Nigga Timeline by American hip hop group Migos
