= The Longest Drink In Town =

Brand of milkshake cup in New Zealand

The Longest Drink In Town is a brand of New Zealand milkshake cup allegedly created in 1968. Although the official documentation on trademarks for the design only go back to the most recent intellectual property update in 2006, it is recalled to have existed and been in use in the late 1970s to early 1980s. It features a red and blue giraffe, named Toby. Milkshake syrups are also sold under the brand by Delmaine Fine Foods since 2014. Ice-cream parlours, fast-food chains, and dairies sell milkshakes in The Longest Drink In Town containers, but sales have declined since the introduction to New Zealand of McDonald's and other global outlets. Over 120 million cups have been sold with The Longest Drink In Town branding, with current annual sales of 3.5 million units. Almost every New Zealander has used one. It is owned by Huhtamäki, formerly Carton Specialties.

== History ==
In 2020 Murrey Smith of Cambridge came forward to claim the giraffe cup was designed by him during his time as a freelance designer, although Smith is actually quoted as stating it was in the late 1970s not the late 1960s. He states he chose a giraffe as it is his favourite animal. He did not name his character creation and in fact the giraffe was not given the name 'Toby' until the winners of a competition by the LDIT Facebook page was announced in early 2018. Originally the colours were orange and purple, compared to the white, red and blue currently used. He also claims he designed a summer version of the cup with the slogan "The Coolest Drink In Town" with the giraffe wearing sunglasses, which was never selected for production. Smith does not earn royalties from the design, a moot point given it was allegedly designed under freelance contract, and in fact Smith has not actually provided any evidence for his assertion other than telling his version of events to a small newspaper publication. More than one person is currently claimed to have been the designer in New Zealand but a very similar version of the cup was also being produced in Australia in the 1960s – so regardless, the cup design including the slogan was almost directly copied from the work of another designer. Historically the design and/or slogan has never been trademarked as intellectual property in Australia but examples exist of the earlier cup. In about 2007, inspired by a love for Kiwiana, Angela Bink approached the owners of the brand who agreed to the design of a plastic cup and a range of other products including children's height charts, baby and adult clothing, tea towels, magnets and badges, and a souvenir set, all incorporating Toby the giraffe.
