= Chan Ah Chee =

Chinese migrant to New Zealand (died 1931)

- 陈达枝
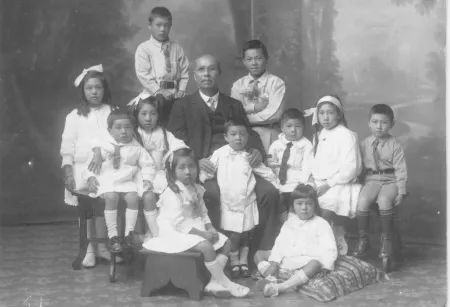
- Chan Ah Chee and his grandchildren and children of Sai Louie
- Born: Chan Dah Chee; 1851; Mong Ngow Dun, Guangdong, China
- Died: 1 January 1931 (aged 79–80); Guangdong, People's Republic of China
- Spouse: Joong Chew Lee
- Children: William Ah Chee, Clement Ah Chee and Arthur Ah Chee

Chan Ah Chee (born Chan Dah Chee; Chinese: 陈达枝; 1851–1930) was a Chinese market gardener in Auckland, New Zealand. He has been noted as one of the most significant pioneers in the early years of Chinese settlement.

Ah Chee established the successful fruit and vegetable company, Ah Chee & Co and was a notable figure in the establishment of early Chinese migration to Auckland.

== Life and family ==
Ah Chee was born in Mong Ngow Dun (Wangniudun), part of Tarp Gwong (Dongguan), Guangdong. He left his home village at age 16 with two brothers to leave the country for work opportunities in New Zealand. Travelling via ship, the brothers were originally set to travel to Dunedin, apparently attracted by the Otago gold rush, but due to sea sickness, they decided to stay at their first stop in Auckland. Upon arrival in 1867, immigration officials registered his name as "Chan Ah Chee", transposing his surname (Chan) with his misspelled given name (Ah Chee). Subsequently, he known as "Ah Chee" in newspapers and land lease documents throughout his time in New Zealand. His family and descendants are referred to as the 'Ah Chee' family.

Ah Chee was naturalised in 1882 and in 1886 brought Joong Chew Lee (also known as Rain Chan/See) to New Zealand to marry. Joong was one of only nine recorded Chinese women in Auckland according to the 1881 census. She was also noted to be instrumental in the family's success due to her proficiency to read, write and speak English as well as Cantonese.

The couples wedding day was reported in newspapers:

On Thursday morning a marriage took place at the Registry Office, Auckland, of Ah Chee, gardener, Mechanic's Bay, to Rain See, of Canton. The bride and bridegroom were accompanied by a party of friends. The ceremony took place at the Registrar's office. The bride who presented an extremely interesting and pretty appearance, was dressed in Chinese costume, and manifested considerable shyness during the ordeal. She had a clear complexion, and looked about eighteen or nineteen years old; had a delicate round race, with a pair of dark eyes, which she kept fixed on the floor most of the time. Her hair was gathered on the top of her head in Chinese style, and fastened with artificial Chinese flowers. She was dressed in a dark blue underskirt, richly embroidered, cut just short enough not to encumber her in walking; a light blue jacket of some delicate material trimmed with light green silk. The jacket hung loose and had wide sleeves. Rich, and apparently gold, bracelets were on her wrists, and her fingers were encircled by two or three gold rings. She also wore gold earrings. On her feet she wore white silk Chinese shoes with flowers embroidered on and around them.

— Taranaki Herald, Volume XXXV, Issue 6975, 9 27 January 1886, Page 4

Ah Chee had five children, all of whom were born in Auckland. The first two children died at birth, Williiam Ah Chee (Chan Wah Fook) born in 1889, Clement Ah Chee (Chan Wah Dong) born in 1892 and Arthur Ah Chee (Chan Wah Ying) born in 1895. His grandson (son of Clement Ah Chee and May Yuk Doo) was Tommy Ah Chee, creator of New Zealand supermarket chain, Foodtown and fast-food restaurant, Georgie Pie.

He and his family lived in Parnell, where they grew a market garden, known as Kong Foong Yuen (Chinese: 江风园) which translates to Garden of Prosperity.

Ah Chee retired in 1914, and left New Zealand with his wife for Guangdong in 1920. He lived in China until his death in 1930.

== Career ==
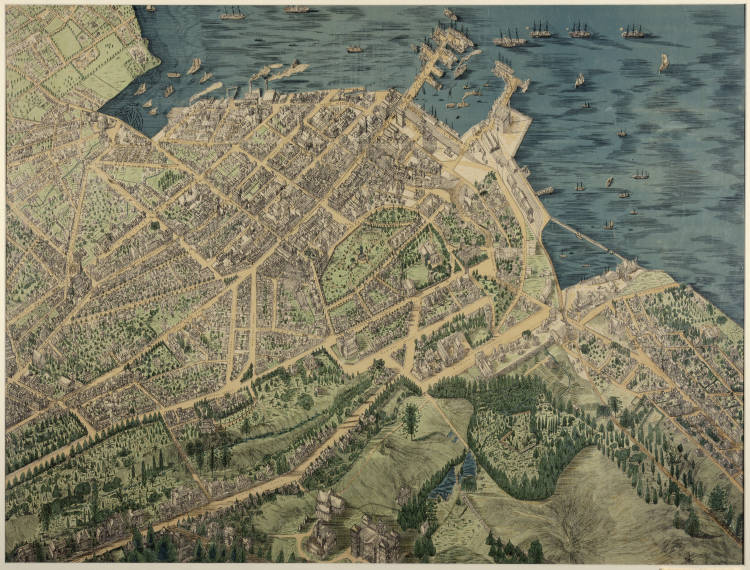
A birds-eye view map of Auckland showing Chan Ah Chee's market garden on the centre right behind the trees of Auckland Domain

Ah Chee established two centrally located fruit shops by 1880, under the name Ah Chee & Co: one on 13 Queen Street, across from The Auckland Chief Post Office, and the other across from the Auckland Ferry Terminal on the corner of Queen and Quay Street. Between 1900 and the 1930s, the Ah Chee family owned at least seven shops in Auckland.

=== The Kong Foong Yuen Market Garden ===
The Kong Foong Yuen (Chinese: 江风园) market garden was established on seven and a quarter acres of land on Parnell's Gillingham Street which Ah Chee leased in August 1882. The market garden at this site remained for thirty-eight years. The garden's soil of volcanic origin and its origins as a raupō swamp made it an ideal place to grow vegetables.

Over the years, the gardens housed many of Ah Chee's family as well as members of the Chinese settler community. The Ah Chee family were noted to support new Chinese settlers in providing accommodation and work as well as paying for travel expenses and poll taxes.

Archeological discoveries confirm the Ah Chee's lived a privileged lifestyle, taking part in traditional Chinese celebrations with friends and workers as well as, reoccurring travel to China. Family accounts record that the family had servants who helped with housework and were a significant and integrated among Auckland social circles.

A 1894 article details the relationship between the Ah Chee family and prominent Auckland figures:

On a recent Monday afternoon Lady Glasgow sent a note to her greengrocer (Ah Chee) that she and her daughters would pay him a visit at his home at Mechanics' Bay Gardens on the following day. At the time appointed the ladies duly arrived, and were entertained by Mrs Ah Chee. The Ladies Boyle played and sang, partook of afternoon tea, fruit, etc., and the whole party (yellow and white) had a good time. Lady Glasgow requested a photo of the Chee family group for her album, and the delighted Chee immediately ordered a splendid enlarged photo. Ah Chee forwarded Lord Glasgow a present of half-a-dozen silk handkerchiefs from the Flowery Land. Aren't the opposition greengrocers just mad!

— Social Sphere Observer, Volume XV, Issue 796, 31 March 1894, Page 6

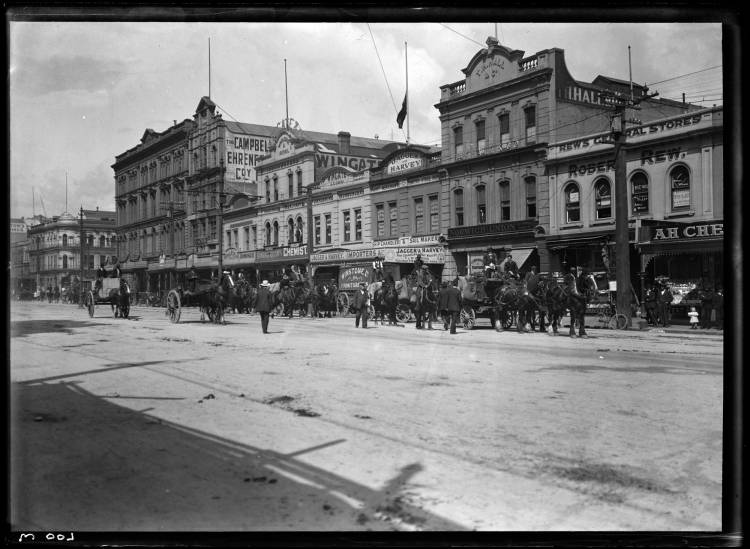
Ah Chee & Co (on far right) Queen Street, Auckland Central, 1910s

=== Other business ventures ===
By the 1890s Ah Chee established other market gardens, notably in the Auckland suburbs of Epsom and in 1905, Ah Chee purchased 35 acres on Rosebank Road in the Auckland suburb of Avondale which served as another market garden. This site was used as a market garden up until World War II when it was converted to a hospital for the US Navy. By the end of the war in 1945, the site was reimagined and Avondale Intermediate and Avondale College were built.

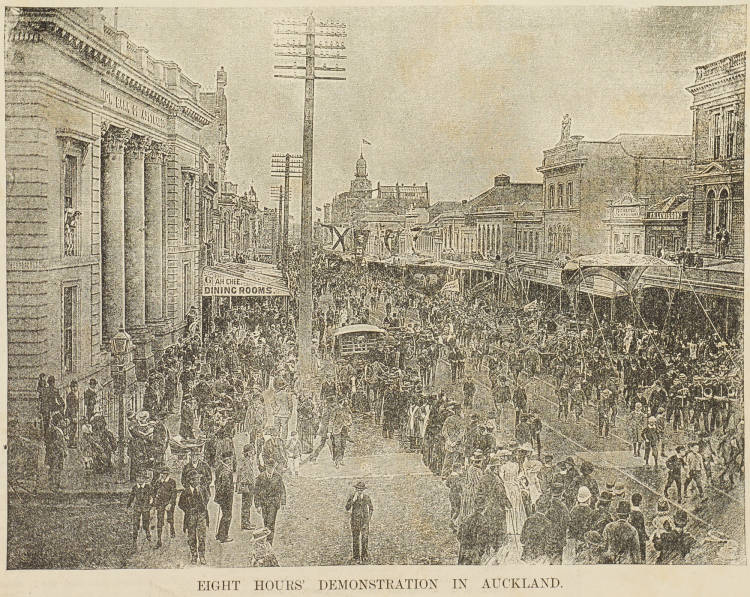
Ah Chee Dining Rooms pictured during 1890 Eight hours' demonstration in Auckland

Ah Chee was involved in multiple business ventures, including in the late 1800s and early 1900s, managing dining rooms and restaurants. These were on Customs Street East (from 1887 to 1888) and Queen Street (from 1889 to 1893). He opened fruit shops throughout Auckland city as well as in Newmarket. He also set up international exporting of dried fungus from New Zealand to China, reported in the Auckland Star:

Fungus of various specie grows freely in the New Zealand bush and has marked affinity for kahikatea or white pine trees. In view of the great demand for fungus in the Orient New Zealand merchants have given attention to the matter of export, and most people will be surprised to learn that this trade has developed to one unusual proportions. Messrs. Ah Chee and Co., the well-known merchants, have been prominent in the shipment of fungus for many years, and they now dispatch about 80 percent of the fungus that is sent from the port of Auckland.

— A Chinese Delicacy: Auckland Star, Volume LIII, Issue 296, 14 December 1922. Page 8

By 1920, the land had been under the Ah Chee family's care for close to 30 years. At this point the land and buildings were given back to the land owners who later leased to the Auckland Rugby League Club and the site became the Carlaw Park rugby league ground.

The overall success of The Kong Foong Yuen market garden contributed to the outcomes of Ah Chee's other business ventures.

== Legacy ==
In 2006 archaeological discoveries were made at the site of The Kong Foong Yuen market garden. These discoveries provided insight into the lives of the Ah Chee family and those early Chinese migrants who lived on the property. It is noted as a significant finding in historical record of market gardens in early Auckland as well to the early Chinese settlement community. Among findings were a large amount of clay and glass bottles used for rice wine which would have been drunk widely by workers in the gardens. As well as this there were remnants of houses which are believed to be where the Ah Chee family resided. These findings confirmed the communal style living that the Ah Chee family promoted.

Chan Ah Chee and his family thrived in both business and social life in Auckland at a time when anti-Chinese sentiment was evident through the immigration restrictions of the poll tax.
