= Buzzy Bee =

New Zealand toy

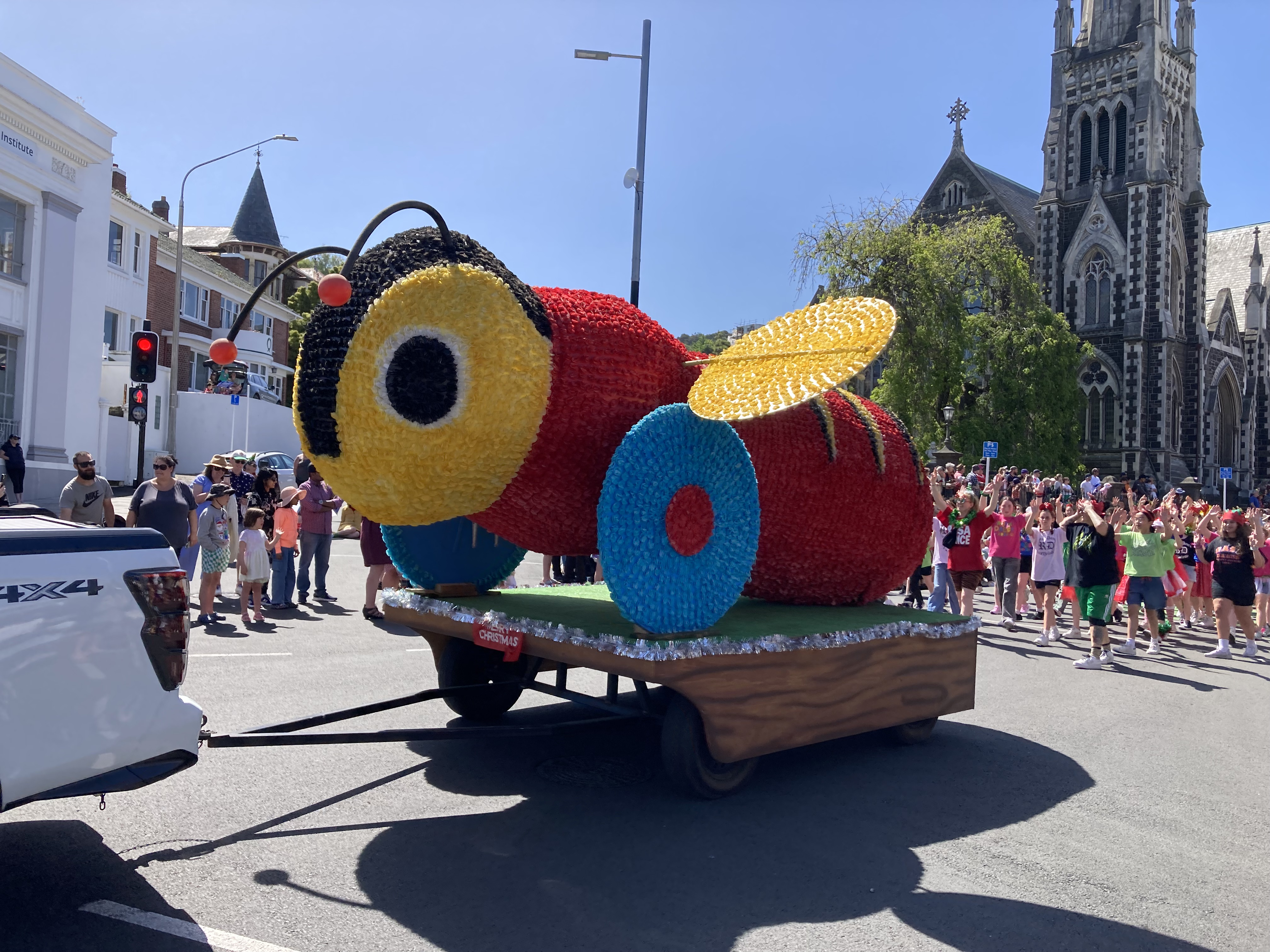
Buzzy Bee float at the Dunedin Santa Parade (2024)

The Buzzy Bee is a popular toy in New Zealand. It resembles a bee with rotating wings that move and make a clicking noise while the toy is pulled along the ground. Possibly based on another earlier concept, it was designed and first produced in Newton, Auckland, in the 1930s, by Maurice Schlesinger. It became popular during the post-war baby boom. Its bright colours and clicking sound call are familiar to many New Zealanders, making it one of the most well-recognised items of Kiwiana. Since this time however, the Buzzy Bee has branched out into various merchandise including books, puzzles and clothing.

It was so popular that, from 1993 to 2008, it was a part of the consumer price index basket in New Zealand.

== Promotion ==
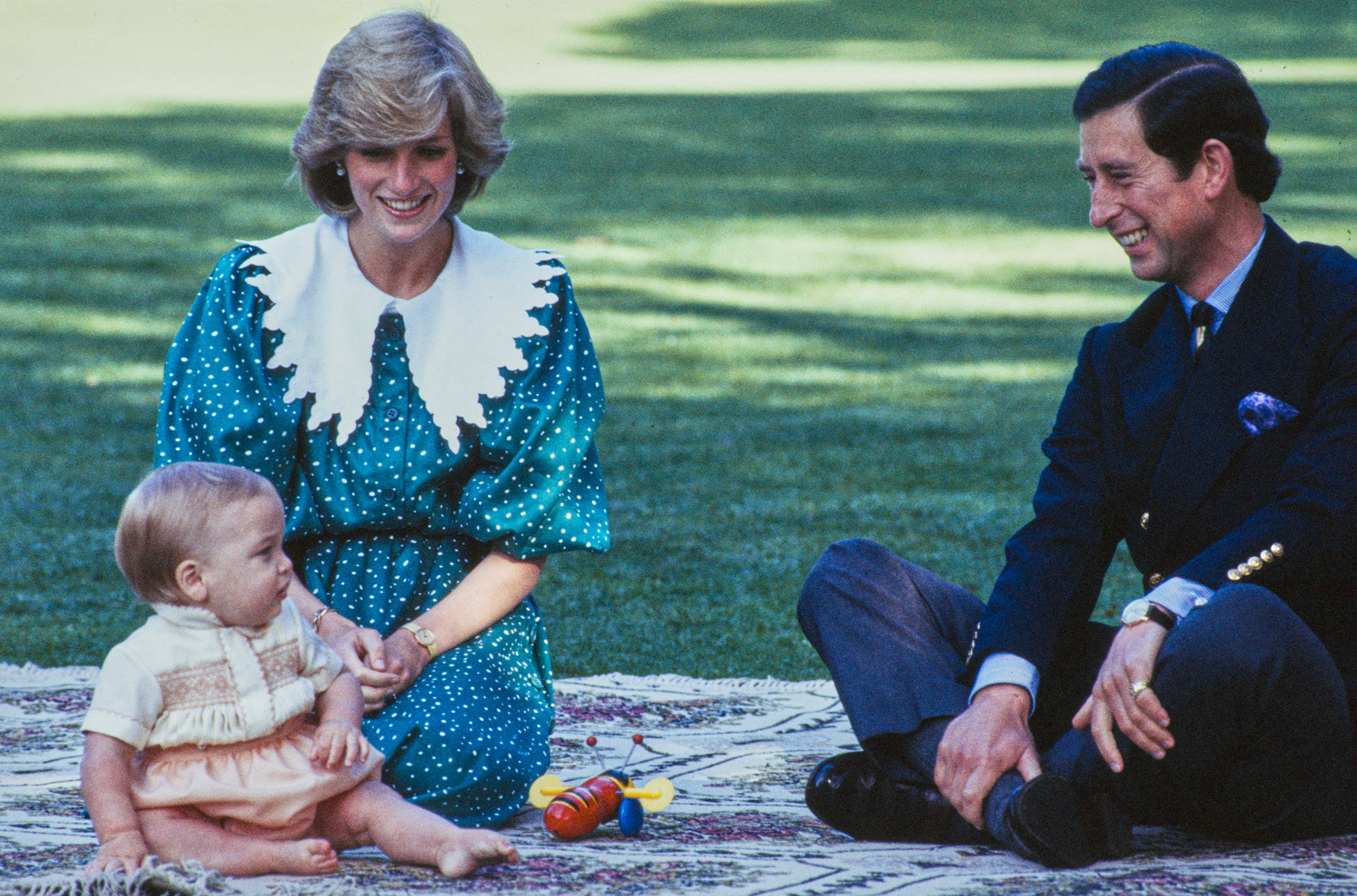
Prince William with his parents playing with a Buzzy Bee at Government House, Auckland, during their 1983 tour of New Zealand

The Buzzy Bee received significant coverage during the visit of the Prince and Princess of Wales in 1983 with their infant son, Prince William, who played with a Buzzy Bee on the lawn of Government House.

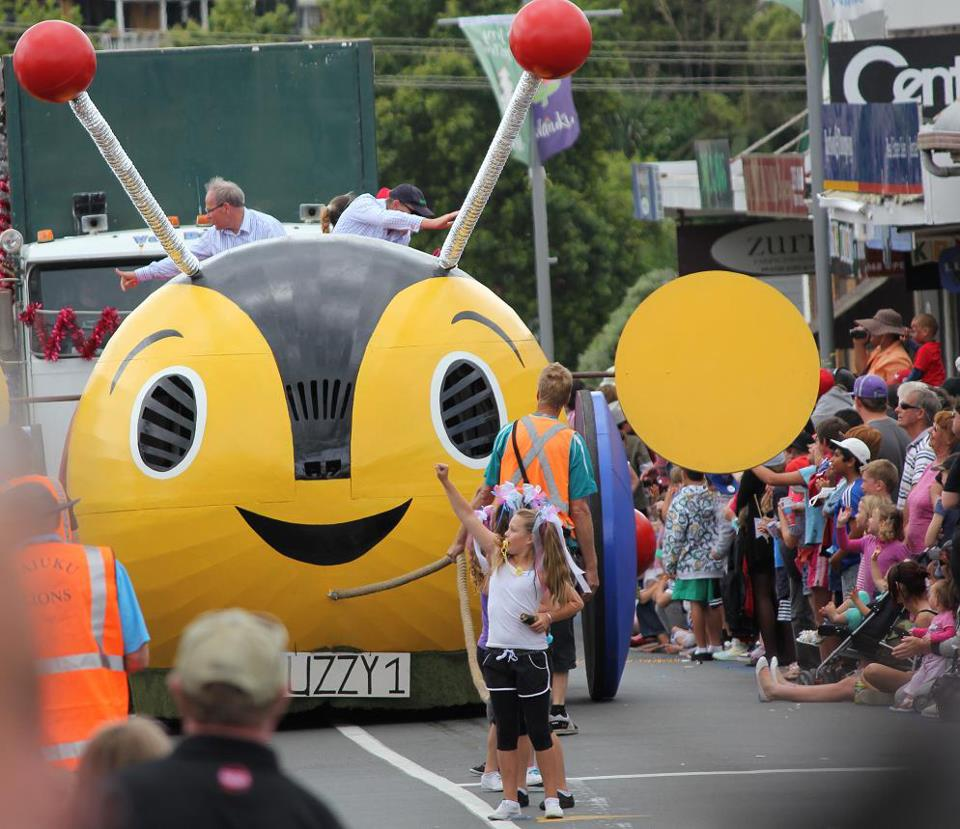
A Buzzy Bee-themed float in the Waiuku Christmas parade (2012)

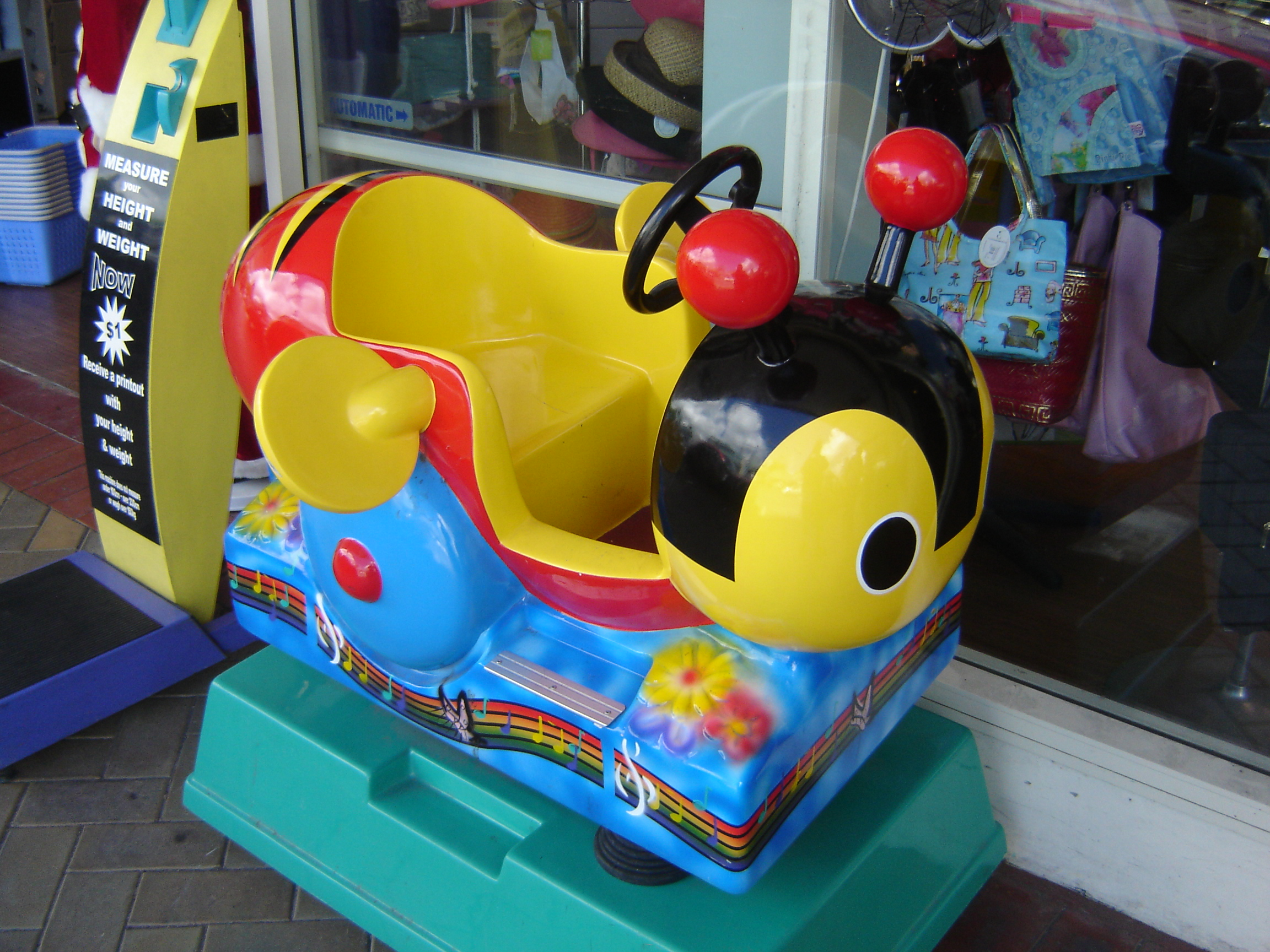
A children's ride in the shape of a Buzzy Bee in Warkworth

As an iconic New Zealand symbol, the Buzzy Bee caricature was used on the keel of NZL84, one of Emirates Team New Zealand's entrant yachts for the America's Cup held in Valencia, Spain, in 2007.

== Adaptations ==
In June 2007, plans were unveiled for a Buzzy Bee stage show "Buzzy Bee's Big Day Out". The company behind the show also revealed that they had made an animated show reel and were finalising details of a distribution deal, and that they hoped to begin work on an animated series for television.

An animated TV show, Buzzy Bee and Friends, premiered on TV2 in 2009; 52 episodes were produced.
