= Auckland Savings Bank Building =

Historic building in Auckland, New Zealand

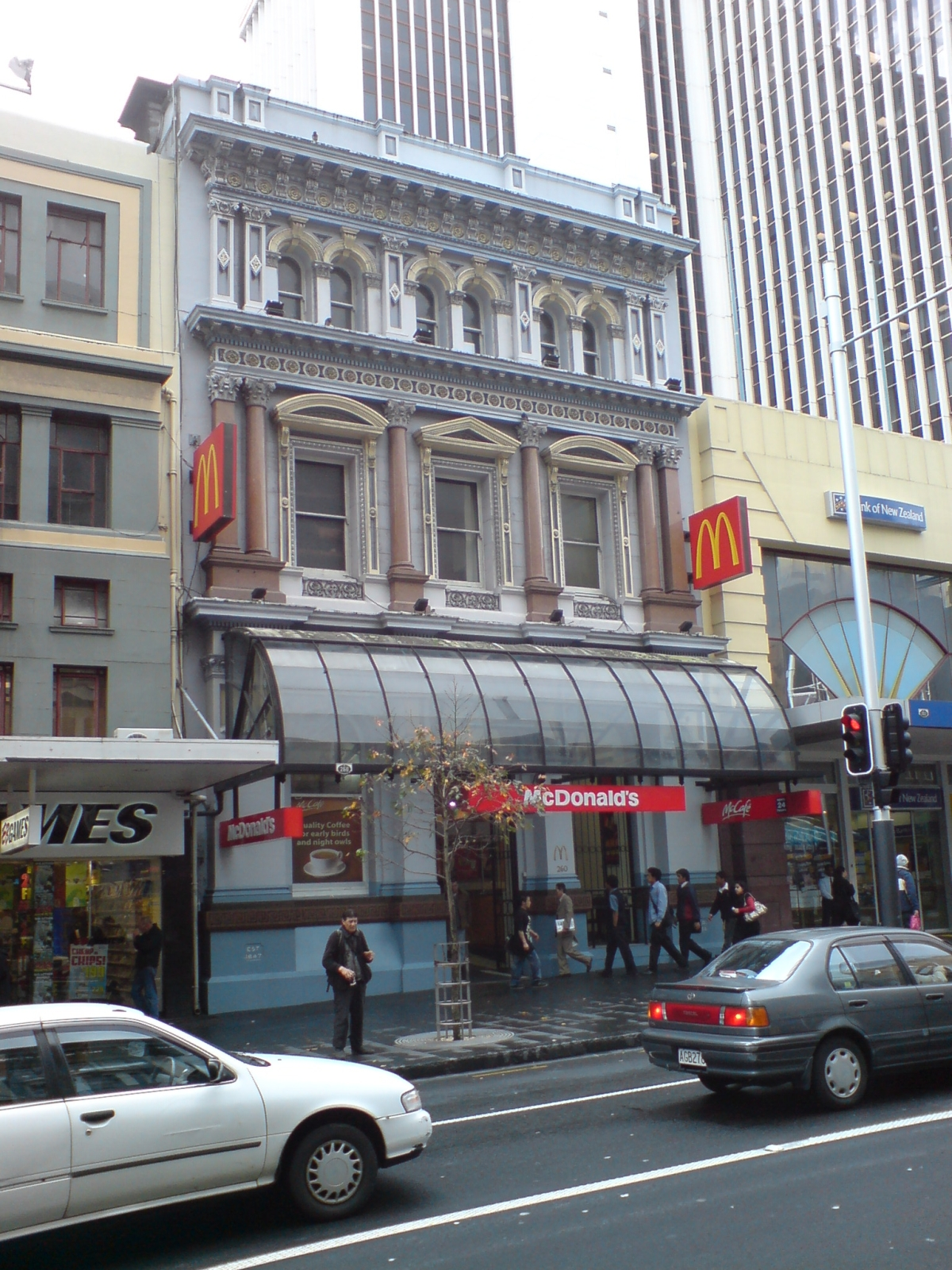
- The facade of the former bank
- Interactive map of the Auckland Savings Bank Building area
- Alternative names: McDonald's Queen Street

General information
- Architectural style: Neo-Renaissance
- Location: Auckland, New Zealand, 260 Queen Street
- Coordinates: 36°51′01″S 174°45′54″E
- Current tenants: McDonald's New Zealand
- Completed: 1884

Heritage New Zealand – Category 1
- Designated: 27 July 1988
- Reference no.: 4473

The Auckland Savings Bank Building is a Category I historic building at 260 Queen Street, Auckland CBD, New Zealand. The building is recognised as the oldest intact bank building in central Auckland and a significant example of late 19th-century commercial architecture. Constructed in 1884, it originally served as the premises of the Auckland Savings Bank. In 1977, the building was acquired by the newly established McDonald's New Zealand and converted into a fast food restaurant. It was the first McDonald's restaurant in Auckland and the second in New Zealand, after Porirua. The restaurant closed in 2020 and relocated two doors down Queen Street. In June 2023 McDonald's listed the building for sale. As of April 2024, it remains on the market.

== Architecture ==
The building was designed by architect Edward Bartley, with a facade inspired by Italian Renaissance palazzi—an architectural style often associated with commercial and banking institutions of the era. It is one of the few surviving buildings on Queen Street that is over 100 years old. Significant elements of the facade and interior have been restored and preserved.

== History ==
The building was constructed in 1884 as the head office of the Auckland Savings Bank (ASB), which had been founded in 1847 to promote thrift and financial literacy among Māori and working-class Aucklanders. Its construction coincided with a period of rapid economic growth and the expansion of savings deposits during the 1870s and 1880s. The building replaced an earlier brick structure on the same site and was part of a broader trend in which several banks along Queen Street were being established or enlarged.

ASB occupied the building until 1968, after which it was used for various alternative purposes, including a McDonald's fast food restaurant and dance studios.

== Gallery ==
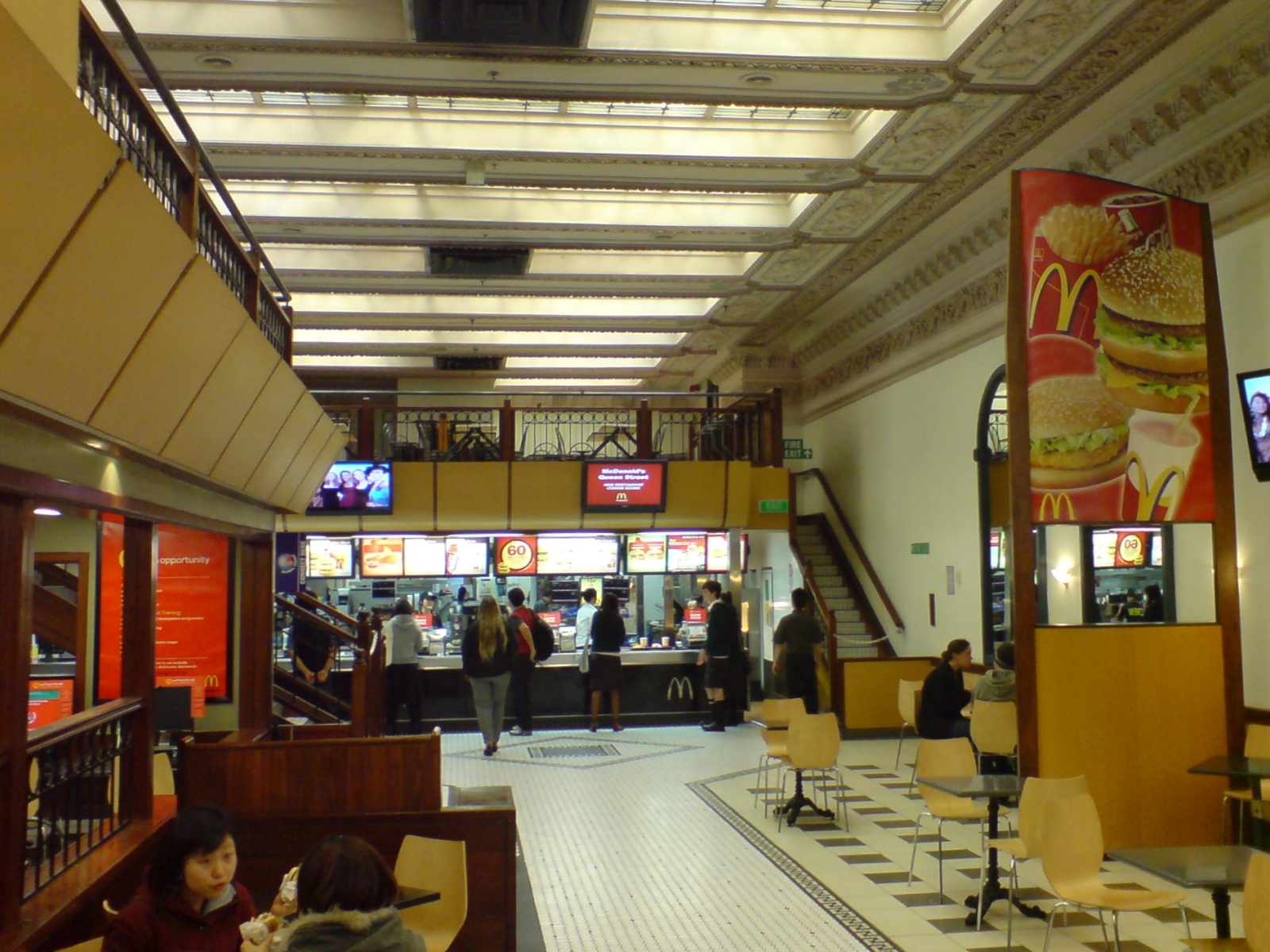
Parts of the old interiors are still visible
