= Chesdale =

New Zealand brand of processed cheese

Chesdale is a New Zealand brand of processed cheese. It is well known for its animated television advertising, with a jingle sung by two cartoon characters, Ches and Dale, wearing gumboots and black singlets.

Chesdale is produced by Fonterra and distributed widely in New Zealand supermarkets. The brand has been distributed internationally with varieties such as Chocolate Cheese being produced from 2005 for the Asian market, where Chesdale is worth $25 million per annum.

== Television advertisement ==
The advertisement was created by art director Don Couldrey and copywriter Robert Merlyn Jenkins in 1969. It is considered an example of Kiwiana, and has been semi-seriously proffered as an icon of New Zealand culture.
