= Elizabeth Fuller (illustrator) =

New Zealand artist

- Born: Hastings, New Zealand
- Known for: Illustration

Elizabeth Anne Fuller (born 1957) is a New Zealand children's book illustrator. She has illustrated Mrs. Wishy-Washy, My Brown Bear Barney and Best-Loved Bear. She was born in Hastings, New Zealand.

In 2008, Fuller received the Storylines Gaelyn Gordon Award for her illustrations for My Brown Bear Barney.

== Books illustrated ==
- 2002 The Best Dressed Bear written by Diana Noonan
- 2000 Apple, Banana, Cherry written by Joy Cowley
- 1995 The Best-Loved Bear written by Diana Noonan
- 1994 Song of the River written by Joy Cowley
- 1986 What is a Huggles? written by Joy Cowley
- and over 60 other picture books and readers.
