= Kiwiburger =

Hamburger sold by McDonald's

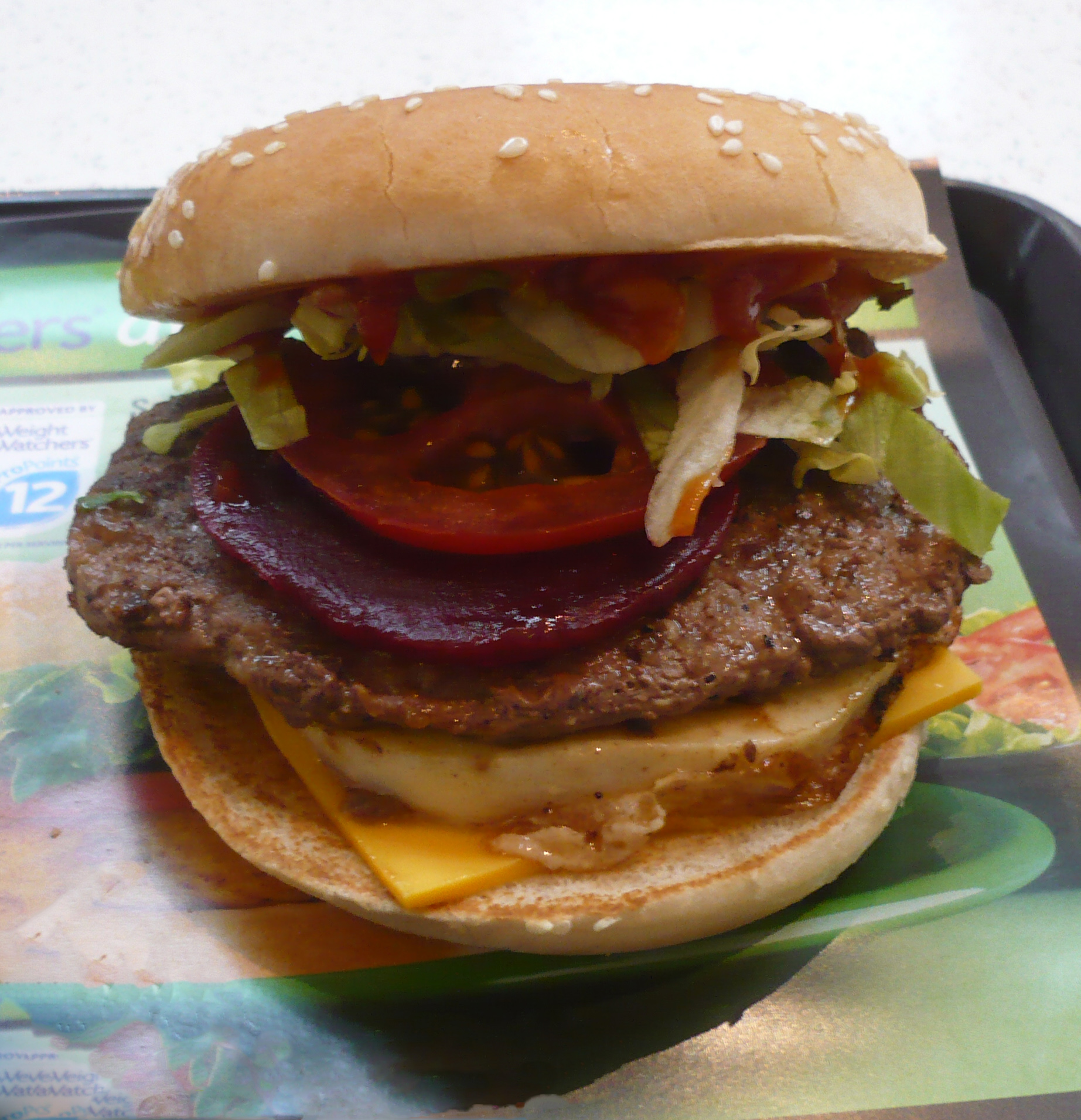
A Kiwiburger with its top bun opened to show its toppings

The Kiwiburger is a hamburger sold at McDonald's restaurants in New Zealand. It consists of a four-ounce (113 g) beef patty, griddled egg, beetroot, tomato, lettuce, cheese, onions, mustard, and ketchup on a toasted bun.

== History ==
The Kiwiburger was the idea of franchisee Bryan Old, who came up with the burger as a nostalgic take on the typical New Zealand hamburger prior to the introduction of McDonald's to the New Zealand market in 1976. Trialled initially in Old's five Hamilton restaurants, it was added to the national menu in 1991.

The Kiwiburger was removed from the national menu in 2004. Since then, it has returned as a limited-time item, including in May 2007, 2009, 2011, 2020-21 and 2023–24.
