= Spaceman Candy Sticks =

New Zealand confectionery

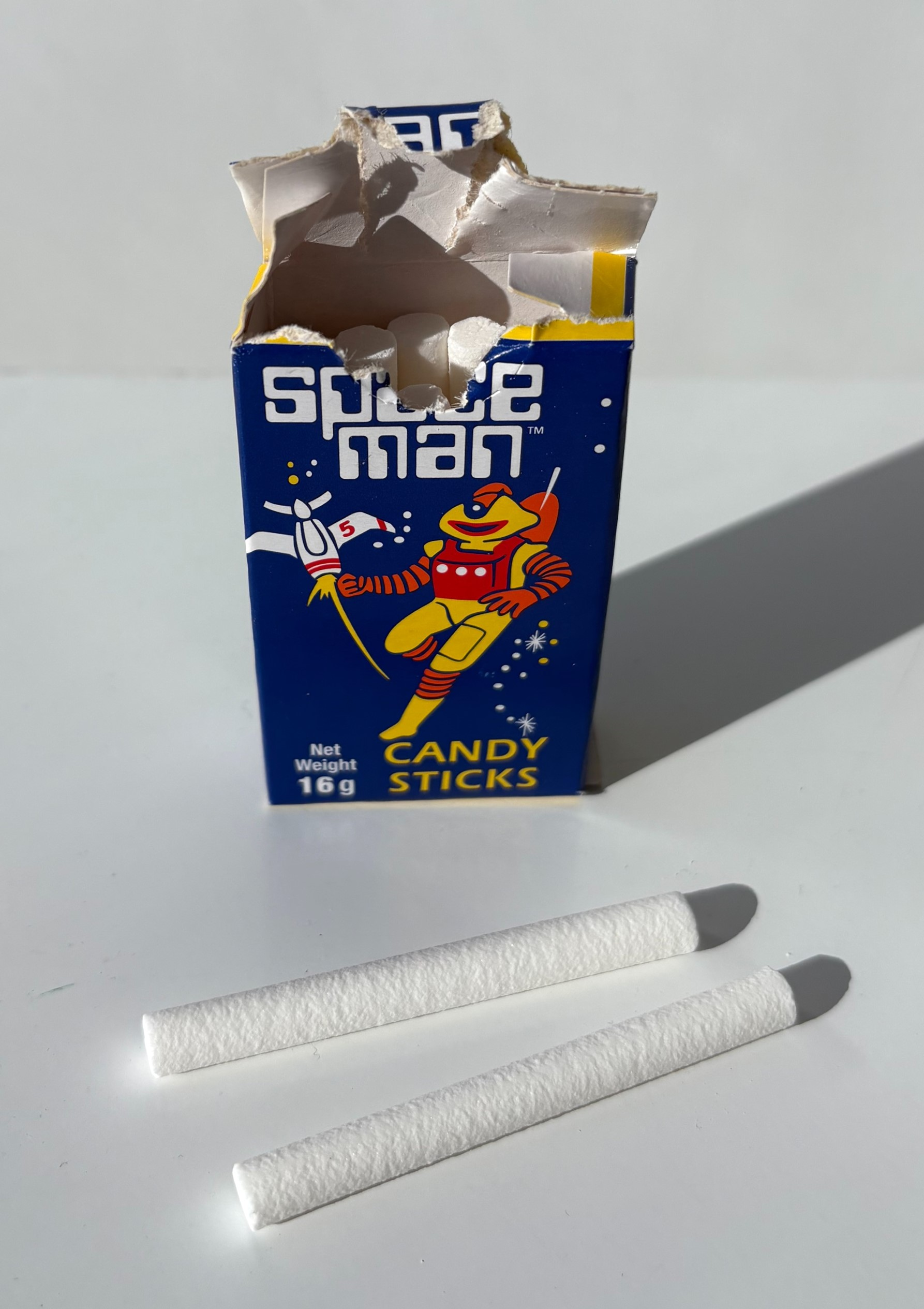
- Product type: Confectionary
- Current owner: Carousel Confectionary
- Country: New Zealand

Spaceman Candy Sticks, formerly Space Man cigarettes are a white candy stick lolly from New Zealand. It is common for New Zealand children to pretend that they are cigarettes. They are made in Palmerston North by Carousel Confectionery, and have been around since the early 1970s.

Writing in the Journal of Consumer Research, Beverland et al. say that Spaceman Candy Sticks may form national identity by a process of 'splitting', where outsiders and New Zealanders perceive Spaceman Candy Sticks differently. New Zealanders would see them as a cigarette.

== History ==
Spaceman candy sticks have been around since the early 1970s, known originally as 'Space Man cigarettes'. Due to concerns by a health watchdog that consumers of the sweet would become cigarette addicts, the name was changed to 'Space Man candy sticks'. In 2006 Bonza Confectionery, the maker of Spaceman Candy Sticks, was purchased by Carousel Confectionary and removed the red tip from the sweet to help remove the association with cigarettes.
