= Wangniudun =

Wangniudun 望牛墩镇
- Town
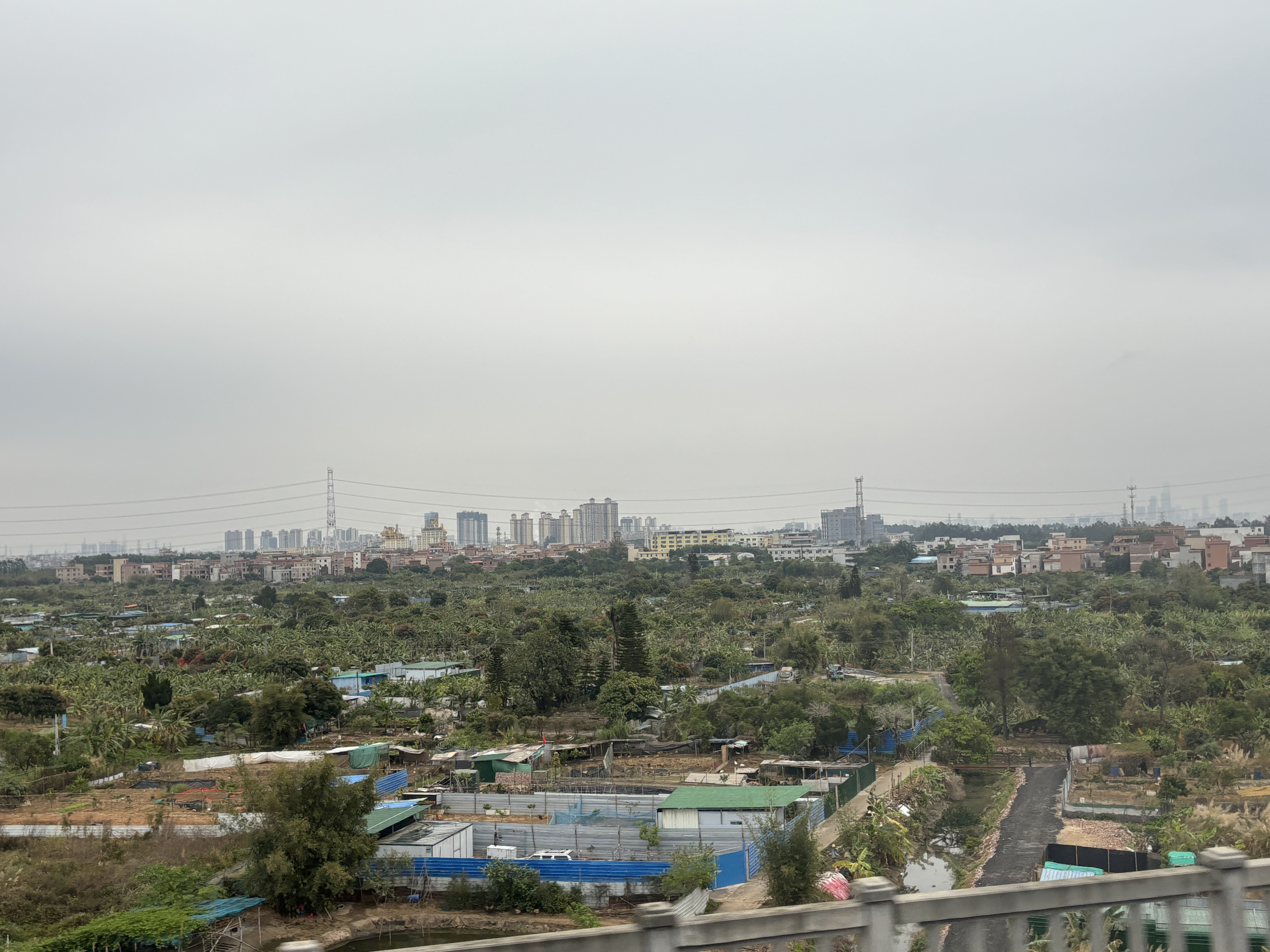

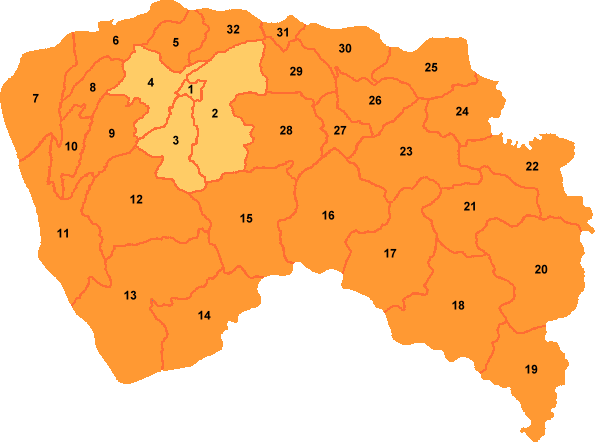
- Wangniudun is labeled '8' on this map of Dongguan

- Location in Guangdong
- Coordinates: 23°03′20″N 113°39′23″E
- Country: People's Republic of China
- Province: Guangdong
- Prefecture-level city: Dongguan

Government
  - Mayor: Du Weiquan (杜伟权)

Area
  - Total: 31.57 km^{2} (12.19 sq mi)
- Elevation: 6.1 m (20 ft)

Population
  - Total: 90,800
  - Density: 2,880/km^{2} (7,450/sq mi)
- Time zone: UTC+8 (China Standard)
- Postal code: 523199
- Area code: 0769
- Website: http://wnd.dg.gov.cn/

Wangniudun (Chinese: 望牛墩; pinyin: Wàngniúdūn; Jyutping: mong^{6}ngau^{4}deon^{1}) is a town under the direct administration of Dongguan City in the Pearl River Delta, Guangdong province.

== Population ==
Its hukou population is 44,600, but the total population is 90,800, residing in an area of 31.57 km^{2} (12.19 sq mi).

== Location ==
It lies 10 kilometres (6.2 mi) northwest of the urban centre of Dongguan, 40 km (25 mi) south of Guangzhou, and 90 km (56 mi) north of Shenzhen.

== Transportation ==
The G4 Beijing–Hong Kong and Macau Expressway, China National Highway 107, Dongguan Ring Road (东莞市环城路) pass through or near the town.
