= Fruit Bursts =

New Zealand confectionery

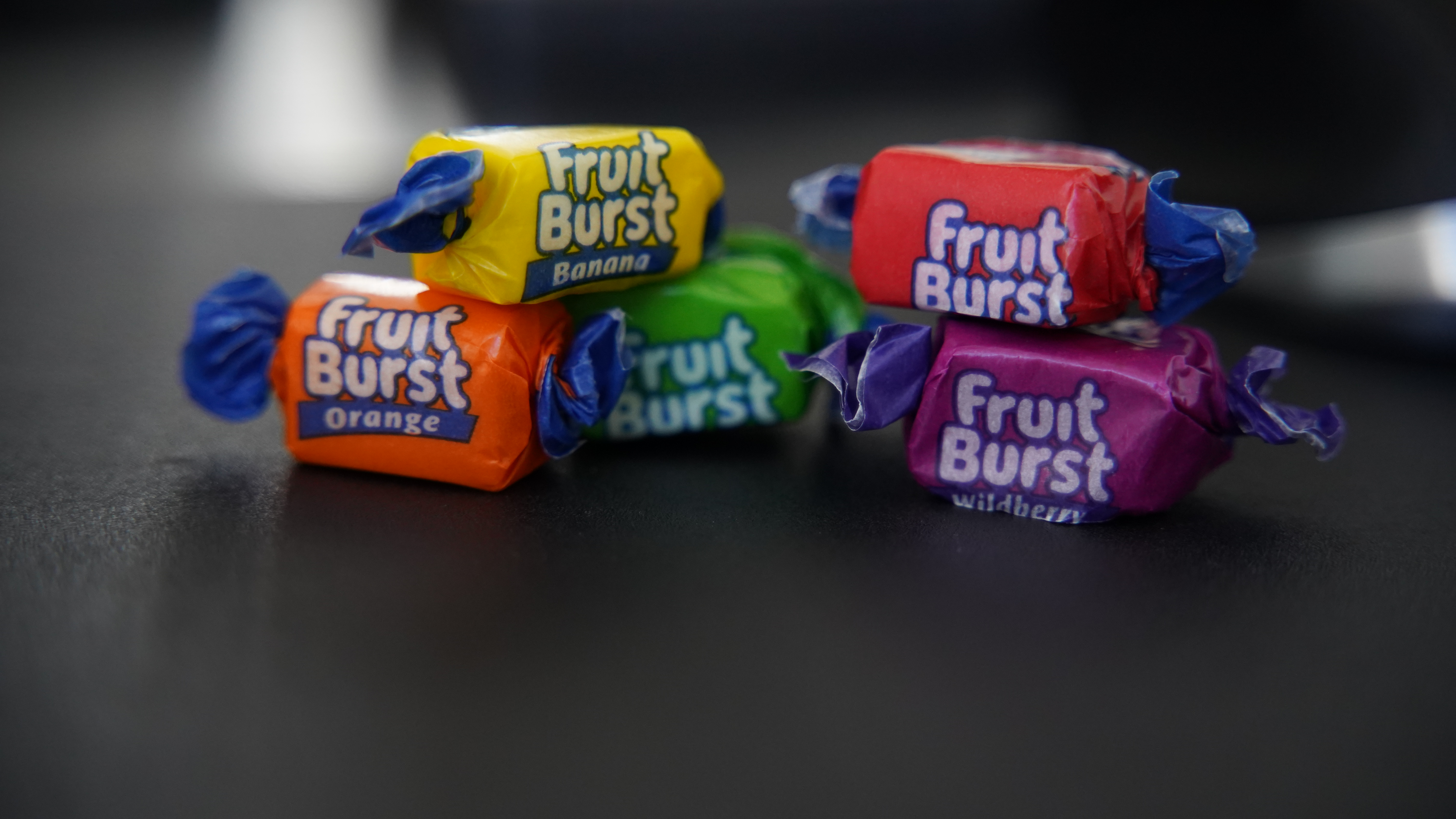
Current flavours of Fruit Bursts

Fruit Bursts is a New Zealand confectionery produced by Pascall. As of March 2025, there are five flavours: banana; lemon and lime; orange; strawberry; and wildberry with peach being a former flavour.

== History ==
In the early 2010s, the peach flavour was discontinued which made many New Zealanders disappointed. Due to this, a Facebook group named "Bring Back Peach Fruit Bursts" was formed in 2012, which has over 16,000 members as of March 2025.

In 2021, Pascall launched a new type of lolly inspired by the flavour: Pascall Peach Flavour Lumps, a variation of Pineapple Lumps. This followed several other combinations Pascall had done with Pineapple Lumps, such as L&P and Pascall Milkshakes.
