= Pascall (company) =

Australian and New Zealand confectionery brand

- Predecessor: James Pascall Ltd; Cadbury-Fry-Pascall Pty. Ltd; Cadbury-Fry-Pascall Australia; Cadbury Schweppes; Cadbury plc
- Founded: 1866; 160 years ago in London, United Kingdom
- Founder: James Pascall
- Successor: Mondelez International

Pascall is an Australian and New Zealand confectionery brand owned by Mondelēz International. Originally, the company started as James Pascall, a British manufacturer of sugar confectionary in 1866. In 1923, Pascalls joined forces with Cadbury and its sister business J. S. Fry & Sons to setup a factory in Tasmania to build a factory to produce all three companies products. The original British firm was purchased by Beecham Group in 1959 and was merged with its existing confectionery firm R S Murray. The Pascall Murray business was purchased by Cadbury in 1964, but the remnants of the UK Pascall business was sold to Tangerine Confectionery in 2008.

== Original company ==
James Pascall was born Croydon in 1838, the son of a baker and confectioner. Pascall initially worked as a salesman for Cadbury, but in 1866 he set up a small shop in Wells Street off Oxford Street with his brother Alfred. The company moved to a larger site in Valentine Place on Blackfriars Road in 1877 with chocolate production starting a year later. The factory was extended in 1889, while in 1888 they started building an additional factory at Streatham Road, Mitcham. A large section of the Blackfriars site burnt down on 1 October 1897, and a new factory was designed by the architect W. H. Woodroffe to replace it. Pascall told Robert W. Bowers in his book Sketches of Southwark Old and New in 1902, that rival manufacturers offered voluntary assistance and even offered to delay work.

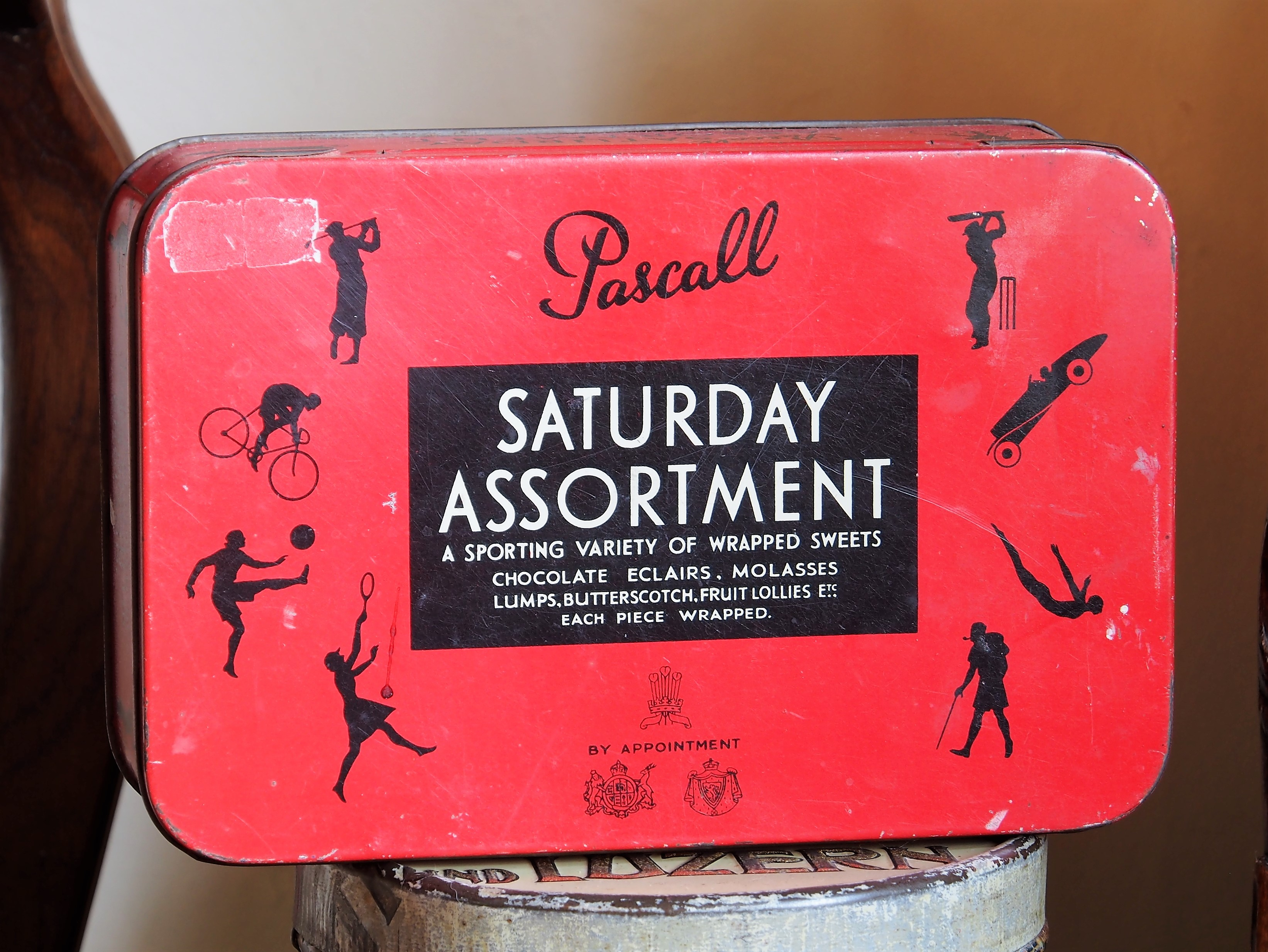
Pascall Saturday assortment from 1930s or 40s

The business was formally incorporated on the 11 June 1898 as James Pascall Ltd. Pascall was a liberal employer, with staff normally working 8 hours a day, considerably less than the Factory Act allowed at the time. One of the company's most successful lines at the turn of the century was Golden Maltex, a confectionery product made with malt extract, while in 1916 they purchased a licence to manufacture Life Savers in the United Kingdom. During a sugar shortage in 1917, Pascall's produced a pink candy intended as bee food that was laced with antiseptic to prevent human consumption, while they joined the Bribery and Secrets Commission Prevention League in the same year. In 1919, the company presented the profits earned from the pink bee candy to the Board of Agriculture and Fisheries, as promised in 1917, as a cheque for £175 1s 6d, which, as per the agreement, was given to the charity the Gardeners Royal Benevolent Association. In 1918, James Pascall died, with his son Sydney taking over as managing director and chairman of the business. The company became listed on the London Stock Exchange in 1920, with a capital balance of £650,000, while agreeing with the British Cocoa and Chocolate Company, the holding company for Cadbury & J. S. Fry, to build a joint factory in Tasmania under the control of a new firm, Cadbury-Fry-Pascall Pty. Limited (CFP) and the cost of between £300,000 and £400,000.

During 1922, the Prince of Wales gave Pascall's the Royal Warrant, and by 1930, they were claiming to be the creator of the individually wrapped Bonbons. The company's finances during the 1920s were fluctuating. In 1921, they had made a loss of £74,672, but in the following three years it had made a profit of £30,035, £34,073 and £7,161. In 1925, they had grown to £18,610 while in 1927 they were £24,610, but they had dropped to £8,642 in 1928. In 1929, the company had seen profits grow to £20,479, but the following year saw a loss of £53,144, followed by a smaller loss of £22,212 in 1931. Due to the poor management of the company, Sydney Pascall resigned as managing director in 1930, before leaving his role as chairman in 1932. The company brought in Edward Cassleton Elliott to replace Sydney Pascall, who brought in new capital and started a turnaround of the business.

== Australian and New Zealand ==
Pascall products were first produced in Australia as a joint venture between the British Cocoa and Chocolate Company, the holding company for Cadbury's & J. S. Fry, and James Pascall at the Claremont factory in Tasmania in 1923. The new business was operated by Cadbury-Fry-Pascall Pty Limited, which Cadbury owned 50%, while Fry's and Pascall owned 25% of the new firm. In readiness for the new factory, Pascall's registered several of their products as trade marks in Australia, including Paradar, Homeland, Her Ladyship, Embassy and White Heather. In the 1930s, Pascall products commenced production in New Zealand under licence to Cadbury-Fry-Hudson Ltd at their factory in Dunedin.

In 1981, Australian Pascall production moved from Tasmania to Melbourne. In New Zealand, most of the products produced by Pascall were made at their own factory in Avondale, Auckland until December 2009, when the factory was closed down and production moved to the Cadbury factory in Dunedin and to factories in Australia and Thailand. The response to the changes has not been popular with New Zealanders, claiming that the Thai made Minties are much softer and do not taste the same.

== Current products ==
- Barley Sugar
- Butter Scotch
- Caramels
- Clinkers
- Eclairs
- Explorers (formerly "Eskimos")
- Fruit Bon Bons
- Fruit Bursts
- Jellies
- Jubes
- Hokey Pokey Lumps
- Licorice Allsorts
- Marshmallows
- Memorables
- Minties (in New Zealand)
- Mints
- Milk Bottles
- Party Pack
- Pineapple Lumps
- Snifters Lumps
- Wine Gums
- Fruit Allsorts
- Milkshakes
- Jaffa Lumps

== Former products ==
=== Australia & New Zealand ===
- Columbines
- Country Mints
- JayBees
- Mr Beans
- Pebbles
- Snifters
- Sparkles
- Swirls
- Tangy Fruits
- Blackberries & Raspberries
- Liquorice Chews, Spearmint Chews, Chocolate Chews

=== United Kingdom ===
- Ambrosia Dessert Chocolate
- Bitter Walnuts
- Butter Almonds
- Butter Bonbons
- Butterscotch
- Brazil Toffee
- Cherry Blossom Pralines
- Clearmints
- French Almond Rock
- Fruity Pops
- Greengage Praline
- Jordan Toffee
- Malt Pralines
- Marshmallow
- Rasberry Pralines
- Queen & Princess Satines
- Saturday Assortment
- Versailles Boxed Chocolates
- Walnut Toffee
- White Heather (Chocolate & Toffee selection sold in the UK from 1866-1969)
