= Tom Ah Chee =

New Zealand businessman (1928–2000)

- Ah Chee at the Ōtāhuhu Foodtown in the 1970s
- Born: Thomas Henry Ah Chee; 4 January 1928; Auckland, New Zealand
- Died: 18 March 2000 (aged 72); Auckland, New Zealand
- Occupation: Businessman
- Spouse: Molly Gee (m. 1954)
- Children: 4

Chinese name
- Chinese: 陈麟智
Transcriptions
Standard Mandarin
- Hanyu Pinyin: Chén Línzhì
Yue: Cantonese
- Jyutping: can4 leon4 zi3

Thomas Henry Ah Chee (4 January 1928 – 18 March 2000) was a New Zealand businessman, who established the Foodtown supermarket chain and the Georgie Pie fast-food restaurant franchise.

Born in Auckland to Chinese parents, he spent most of his early years in China before his father moved the Chee family back to New Zealand following the Japanese occupation of Canton. He took over the family's produce shop in 1951 and before long, recognised the potential for the introduction of American-style supermarkets in New Zealand. In 1958, Chee and two business partners opened the first Foodtown supermarket at Ōtāhuhu. This soon led to more Foodtown supermarkets being opened across Auckland, owned by Progressive Enterprises, a holding company established by Chee, his business partners and investor Brian Picot. Wanting to diversify their business interests, Chee and Picot formed the Georgie Pie fast food restaurant chain, opening the first store in 1977; four more followed in the next five years. Chee retired in 1982, having given up the running of the supermarket business a couple of years earlier. He died of liver cancer at the age of 72 in Auckland.

== Early life ==
Ah Chee was born on 4 January 1928 in Remuera, Auckland, New Zealand, the second child of Clement Calliope Ah Chee, a New Zealand-born Chinese, and his wife May Yuk Doo. His father was a grocer, working in the family business established by Chan Dah Chee, Tom's grandfather, who had emigrated to New Zealand in 1867. The original family name was Chan, but his grandfather's misspelled first name, Ah Chee, was made his legal surname upon his immigration. The business, Ah Chee and Company, was the largest trading company of its kind in the early 1920s but collapsed in 1931 due to the Great Depression. Clement Ah Chee took his family to China, where the children were educated. In 1939, the Ah Chees returned to New Zealand, following the Japanese occupation of Canton.

The Ah Chees opened a produce store in Newmarket, on Broadway, its main thoroughfare, with a second store on Great South Road. Tom Ah Chee resumed his education, despite not initially speaking English. He went to Remuera Primary School and, soon gaining proficiency in the language, then went onto Seddon Memorial Technical College, where he studied industrial science and bookkeeping. While studying he also worked at the family store. In 1951, following the death of his father, Ah Chee took over the business. This entailed him abandoning his tertiary studies; he was studying architecture at Auckland University College at the time.

On 25 September 1954, Ah Chee married Molly Gee at St Luke's Presbyterian Church, Remuera. The couple went on to have four daughters.

== Foodtown ==
The grocery stores were profitable and Ah Chee turned his mind to expansion of the business. Recognising that customers were beginning to prefer shopping in areas with easy parking, he expanded his stores into general groceries as well as fruit and produce. However available space constrained his ability to expand his existing premises. He investigated shopping trends in the United States, particularly the growth in supermarkets there, where shoppers could purchase a range of goods at one store. He took on two partners, two fellow fruiterers, and with them purchased a large 1.1 hectares (11,000 m^{2}) site on Great South Road in Ōtāhuhu where a supermarket, to his design, was built. The funds came from the sale of his produce shop, house and vehicle. The resulting supermarket, named Foodtown and with Ah Chee as the managing director, opened in June 1958 to huge success. As well as being conveniently located to the growing suburb of Ōtāhuhu, it was well sited to service nearby Papatoetoe and Ōtara.

Ah Chee, seeing the success of his first Foodstore, began to plan the development of more. Recognising more financial acumen would be required, he brought in investor Brian Picot, an experienced grocery wholesaler, and a holding company, Progressive Enterprises, was formed; Ah Chee and Picot were managing directors. A second Foodtown was opened at Papakura in 1961, on a site with sufficient parking for 2,000 vehicles, and by 1973, the company, with Ah Chee now its president, had 12 supermarkets across Auckland and a few years afterwards was employing 2,000 staff. A store in Hamilton had opened by the early 1980s.

== Georgie Pie ==
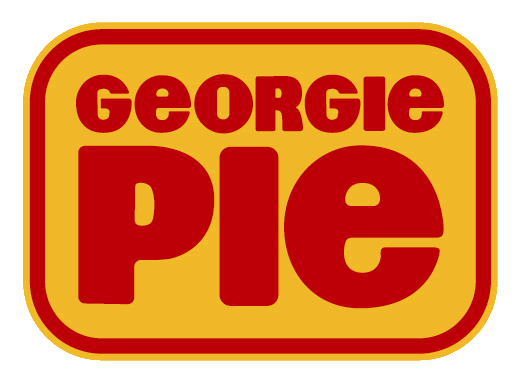
The Georgie Pie logo

Seeking to diversify their business interests, Ah Chee and Picot investigated opening a fast food restaurant. A pitch was made for the New Zealand franchise for McDonald's but this was unsuccessful. Eventually they decided on establishing their own and decided on opening Georgie Pie, which had meat pies, manufactured at Foodtown's bakeries, as its staple food. Ah Chee was also partial to pies. A restaurant was opened in Kelston in 1977 and reportedly was the first fast food restaurant to have a drive-through. Within five years, another four stores had opened at various sites in Auckland.

== Later life and legacy ==
Ah Chee stepped down from Foodtown in 1980 and retired altogether two years later. By this time, the annual revenue of Progressive Enterprises was NZ$200,000,000. He retained shares in the company although these were sold a few years later. In his retirement, Ah Chee acted as a mentor for Chinese in the region. In his final years he developed liver cancer and this led to his death on 18 March 2000. He was buried at Purewa Cemetery in Meadowbank. In 2002, Chee was posthumously inducted into the New Zealand Business Hall of Fame. Ah Chee's wife, Molly Ah Chee, died in 2025.

After Ah Chee departed the company, Foodtown and Georgie Pie continued expand over the next few years. Georgie Pie, having a network of 32 restaurants at its maximum, encountered financial difficulties in the 1990s and was sold in 1996 to McDonalds. It ceased operations two years later. Foodtown had over 30 supermarkets by 2008 but the brand's identity was lost in 2009 when Progressive Enterprises rebranded their stores as Countdown supermarkets.
