= Mrs. Wishy-Washy =

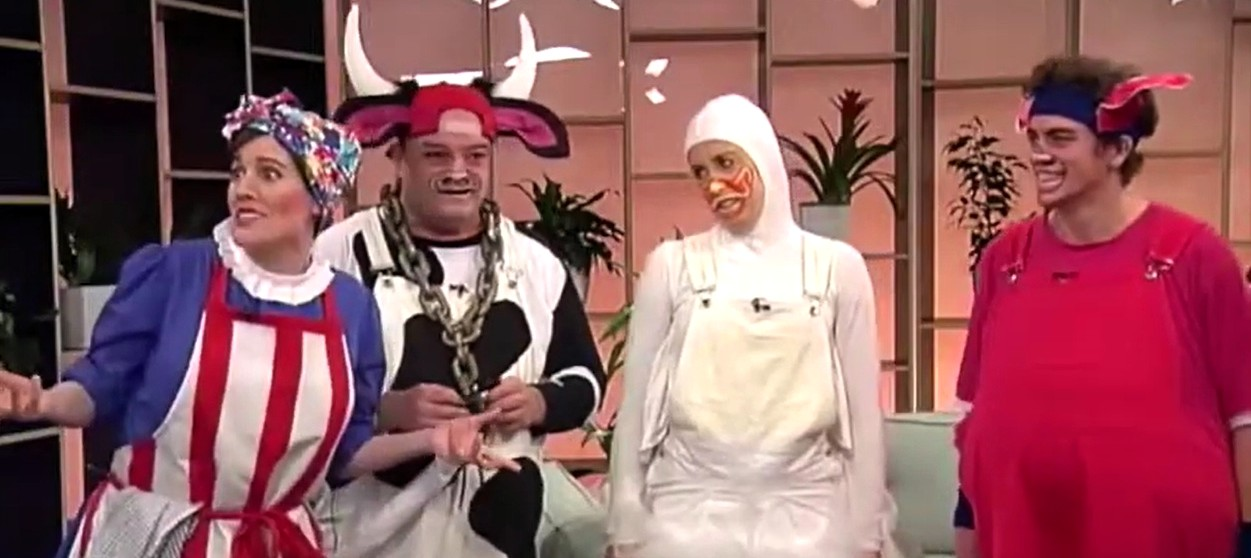
- Mrs. Wishy-Washy, Cow, Duck, and Pig in Tim Bray's production in 2017
- First appearance: Mrs. Wishy-Washy (1980, book debut)
- Created by: Joy Cowley

In-universe information
- Gender: Female
- Family: Mr. Wishy-Washy (husband), Cow (pet), Duck (pet), Pig (pet), Dog (pet)
- Nationality: New Zealand

Mrs. Wishy-Washy is a popular children's book character created by New Zealand author Joy Cowley, and illustrated by Elizabeth Ann Fuller. Since its debut in 1980, the series has sold more than 40 million copies worldwide. The Mrs. Wishy-Washy character has been featured in 20 short stories for early readers over the past 30 years. She is frequently accompanied by her barnyard friends Cow, Duck and Pig. Occasionally featured is her husband, Mr. Wishy-Washy, who is usually depicted washing dishes. Mrs. Wishy-Washy is known for her obsession with cleanliness, and her (failed) attempts to keep the animals from getting dirty. Her most famous quote is "Oh, lovely mud!".

== History ==
The first Mrs. Wishy-Washy book was released in 1980 through Shortland Publications in New Zealand. As of 1996, that title alone had sold 40 million copies worldwide. It was reprinted in 1990 through the Wright Group, where it gained national attention with teachers and administrators in the United States. When Wright Group (as part of Tribune Education) was acquired by McGraw-Hill in 2000, the new conglomerate took over ownership rights of the early titles. More recently, Mrs. Wishy-Washy has been featured as part of Hameray Publishing Group's "Joy Cowley Collection".

== Acclaim ==
Written specifically for children with reading difficulties, the Mrs. Wishy-Washy stories use the "rhyme, rhythm, and repetition" style of learning. This has been exceptionally effective in helping early readers learn to phonetically sound out words, resulting in increased vocabulary and excitement towards reading. In 2006, the National Institute for Early Education Research cited Mrs. Wishy-Washy as a quality learning material, and used it as an example of the importance of early literacy in young children. In addition, Traci Geiser of Education.com named the original book as one of the "10 Best Books to Read with your Toddler".

== Use ==
Due to the character's appeal with young children, Mrs. Wishy-Washy is frequently the subject of lesson plans, Halloween costumes, and other fun activities in the classroom. Each book includes a "Teacher's Notes" section, with suggestions from Joy Cowley on how to effectively use the book to reach struggling readers. Teachers can use the books to introduce the concept of story mapping, story elements, and high frequency words. Most involve either the teacher or children dressing up as characters from the story to increase involvement. Class plays featuring Mrs. Wishy-Washy are a common occurrence, giving children an early taste for acting, storytelling, and public speaking.

== Mrs. Wishy-Washy's rules ==
1. Be Clean
2. Be Neat
3. Look Tidy
4. Smell Sweet

== Books ==
- Mrs. Wishy-Washy (originally released 1980 / reprinted 1990 - 2019)
- Wishy-Washy Day (1993)
- Splishy-Sploshy (1997)
- The Scrubbing Machine (1998)
- Dishy-Washy (1998)
- Mrs. Wishy-Washy bath Tub (1998)
- Mrs. Wishy-Washy's Farm (2001)
- Mud Walk (2002)
- Mr. Wishy-Washy (2003) (reprinted version of Dishy-Washy)
- Mrs. Wishy-Washy Makes a Splash (2003)
- Mrs. Wishy-Washy's Splishy-Sploshy (2005) (reprinted version of Splishy-Sploshy)
- The Hole in the Tub (2005)
- Mrs. Wishy-Washy's Scrubbing Machine (2005) (reprinted version of The Scrubbing Machine)
- Mrs. Wishy-Washy's Christmas (2005)
- Mrs. Wishy-Washy and the Big Wash (2009)
- Mrs. Wishy-Washy and the Big Tub (2009)
- Mrs. Wishy-Washy and the Big Farm Fair (2009)
- Mrs. Wishy-Washy on TV (2010)
- Mrs. Wishy-Washy's Birthday (2010)
- Oops, Mr. Wishy-Washy! (2010)
