= Tangy Fruits =

Discontinued New Zealand confection

- Place of origin: New Zealand
- Created by: Pascall

Tangy Fruits were a round, brightly coloured fruit-flavoured confection, manufactured until 2008 by New Zealand company Pascall and mainly sold in cinemas.

They were packaged in 160 gram plastic lidded pottles, which made less noise than other types of plastic packaging. Tangy Fruits were made under license by Pascall, an Australian and New Zealand confectionery company owned by Cadbury's, who ceased production in 2008 citing a lack of consumer demand. This was protested at the time, and the company has been petitioned to reinstate them along with several other "iconic" confections that were also discontinued.
