= McDonald's New Zealand =

Restaurant chain in New Zealand

McDonald's Restaurants (New Zealand) Limited

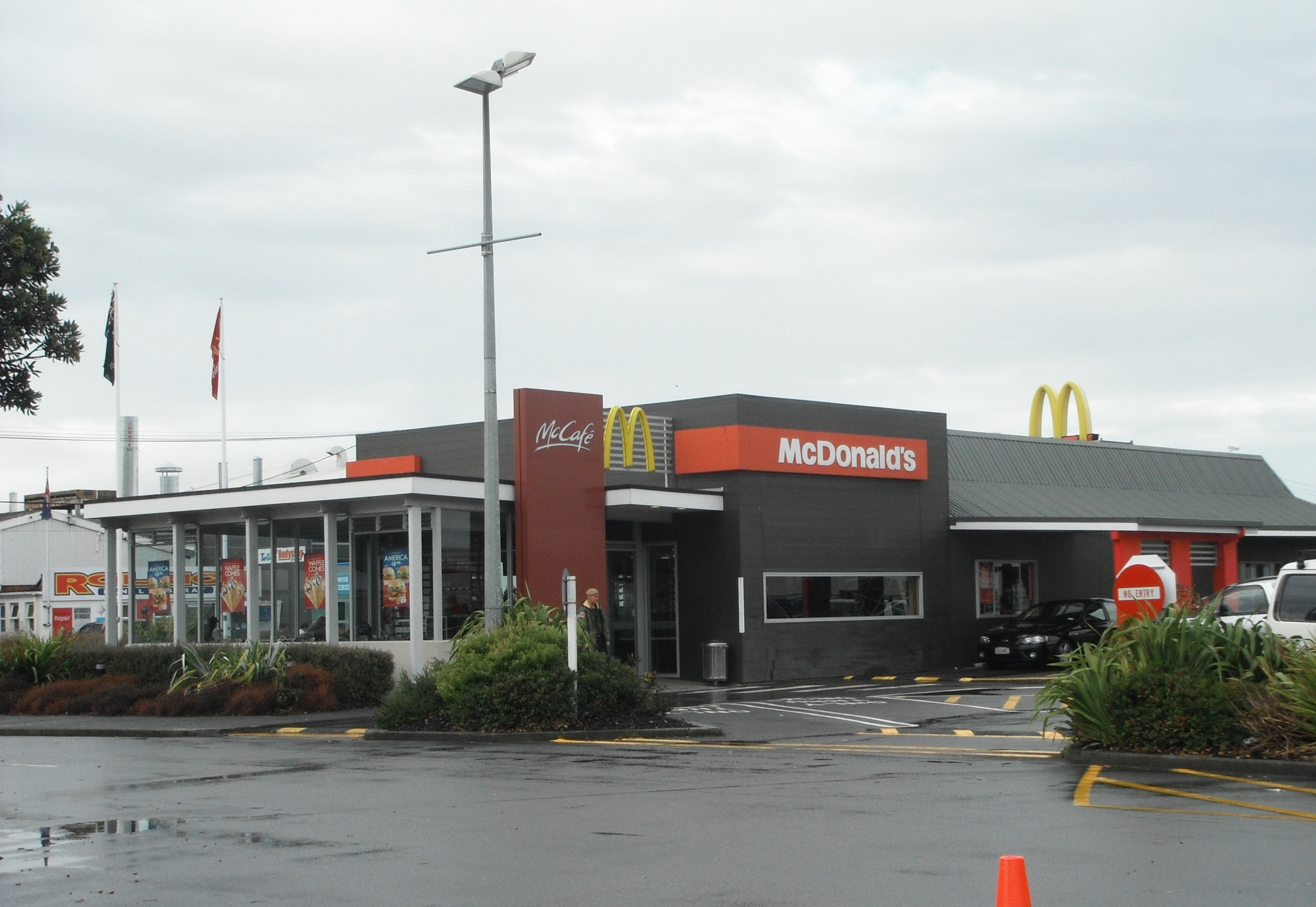
- A stand-alone McDonald's restaurant with a McCafé in Petone, Lower Hutt
- Type: Subsidiary
- Industry: Restaurant
- Genre: Fast food
- Founded: November 4, 1975; 51 years ago (incorporation); June 7, 1976; 50 years ago (first restaurant)
- Headquarters: Greenlane, Auckland, New Zealand
- Number of locations: ▲169 (as of 2023)
- Area served: New Zealand
- Key people: Kylie Freeland (managing director); Malcolm Swan (general counsel)
- Products: Hamburgers; chicken; french fries; soft drinks; milkshakes; desserts; pies; coffee; breakfast
- Services: Franchising
- Parent: McDonald's Corporation
- Subsidiaries: Georgie Pie
- Website: mcdonalds.co.nz

McDonald's Restaurants (New Zealand) Limited (also trading as "Macca's") is the New Zealand subsidiary of the international fast food restaurant chain McDonald's. Its first location opened in 1976. In 2017 McDonald's New Zealand had 167 restaurants operating nationwide, serving an estimated one million people each week. The company earned revenues of over $250 million in the 2018 financial year.

As with McDonald's locations worldwide, the franchise primarily sells hamburgers, cheeseburgers, chicken, french fries, breakfast items, soft drinks, milkshakes and desserts. In response to changing consumer tastes, the company has expanded its menu to include salads, fish, wraps, smoothies, and fruit. The company also operates McCafé chains within many of its stores; through McCafe McDonald's is the largest coffee shop brand in the country.

McDonald's New Zealand operations are based in Greenlane, Auckland.

== History ==
=== 1970s ===
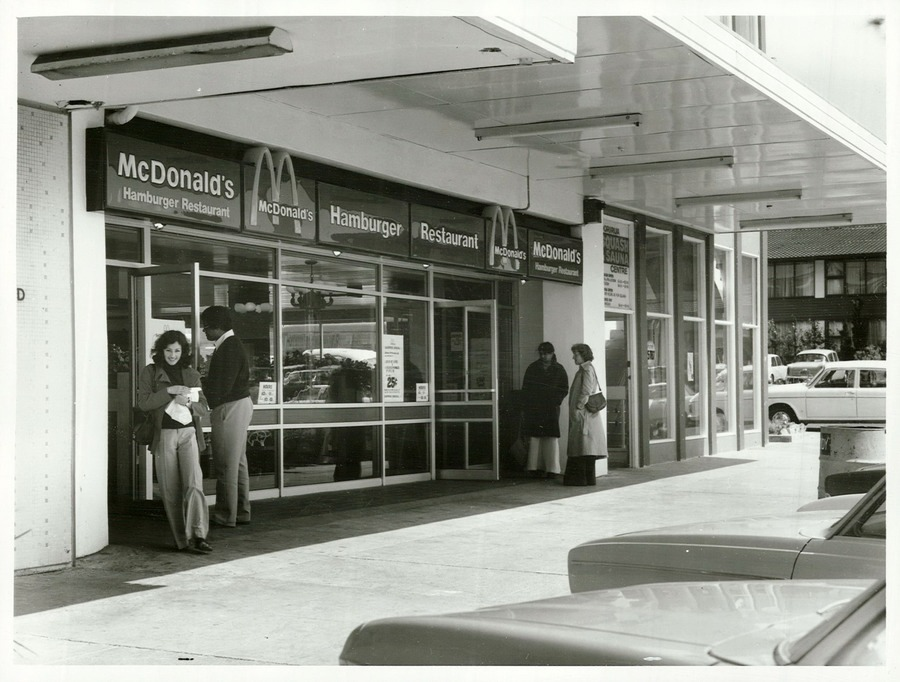
New Zealand's first McDonald's restaurant, Porirua, 1976

The first McDonald's restaurant in New Zealand opened on Cobham Court in central Porirua on Monday 7 June 1976, however it was not officially opened until the following Saturday. The original menu featured the Big Mac (75 cents), Quarter Pounder (65c), Quarter Pounder with Cheese (75c), Filet-O-Fish (65c), cheeseburger (40c) and hamburger (30c).

Problems were encountered opening the restaurant due to strict import laws at the time, which limited importing of overseas products that could be produced in New Zealand. The kitchen for the Porirua restaurant was imported on the condition that it was to allow local companies to reproduce it, and it was to be sent back after 12 months. However, the kitchen had been cemented into the floor and removing parts of it while still maintaining the restaurant operation meant it was impossible. The New Zealand affiliate eventually negotiated with the corporation to import more kitchens in exchange for a large surplus of cheese the New Zealand Dairy Board (now Fonterra) had.

Once the Porirua restaurant was open, there were additional problems with the supply chain, with frequent industrial unrest often shutting down suppliers without warning for weeks on end. An industrial dispute shut down the bun supplier in mid-1976, resulting in McDonald's staff having to drive all over Wellington to find substitute buns, and then cutting the sesame seed buns for the Big Mac using two bandsaws placed side-by-side. Beef patties were initially supplied from the Gear Meat Company in Petone, although supply was haphazard until a purpose-built meat forming machine was acquired in 1977. Like many other companies at the time, Gear Meat was plagued by industrial unrest and closed down without warning in 1982, leaving McDonald's to import beef patties from Australia. The affiliate acquired Gear Meat's patty-forming machine and moved it to Auckland to secure production. By coincidence, part of Gear Meat's former site now contains a McDonald's restaurant.

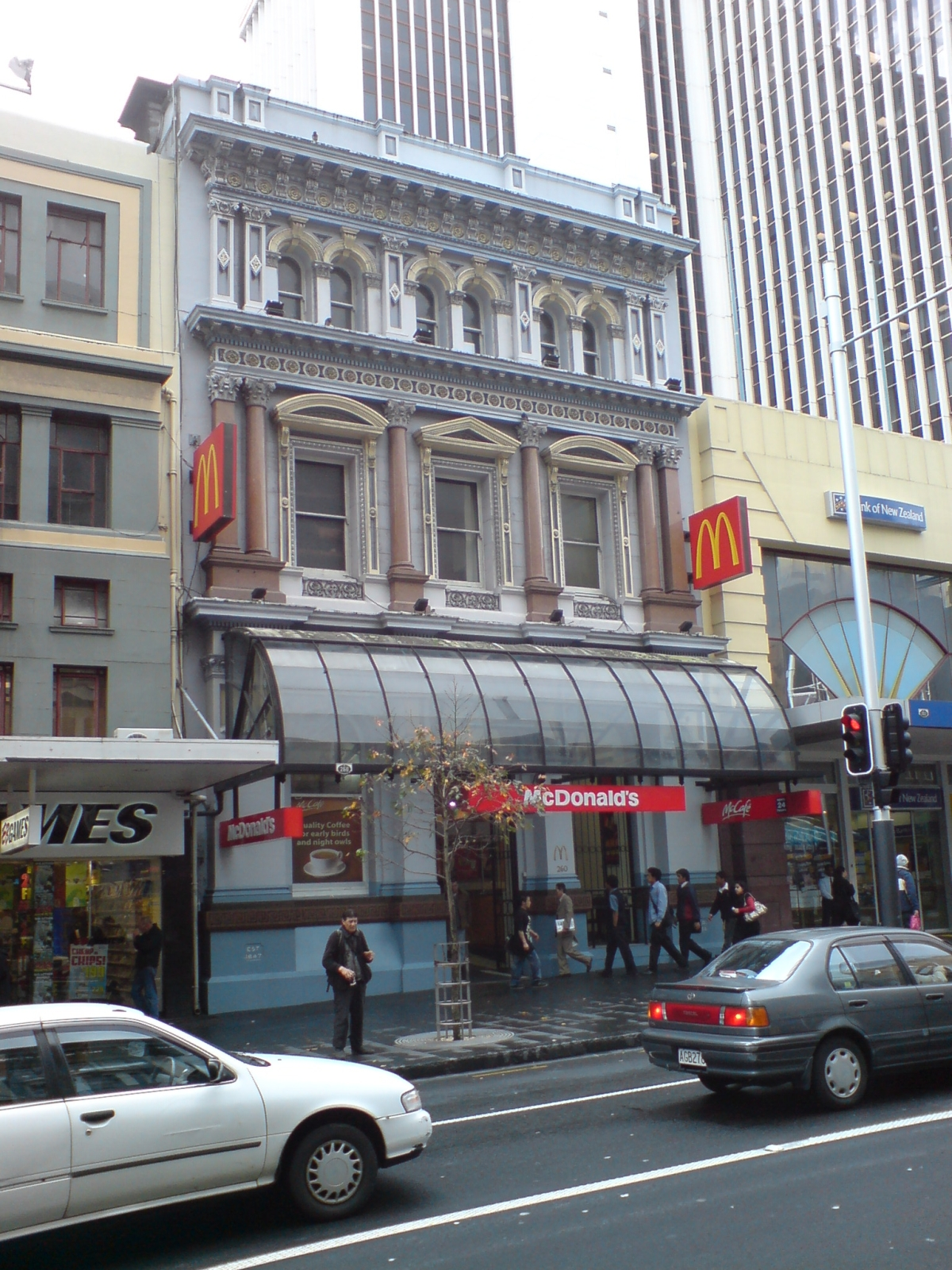
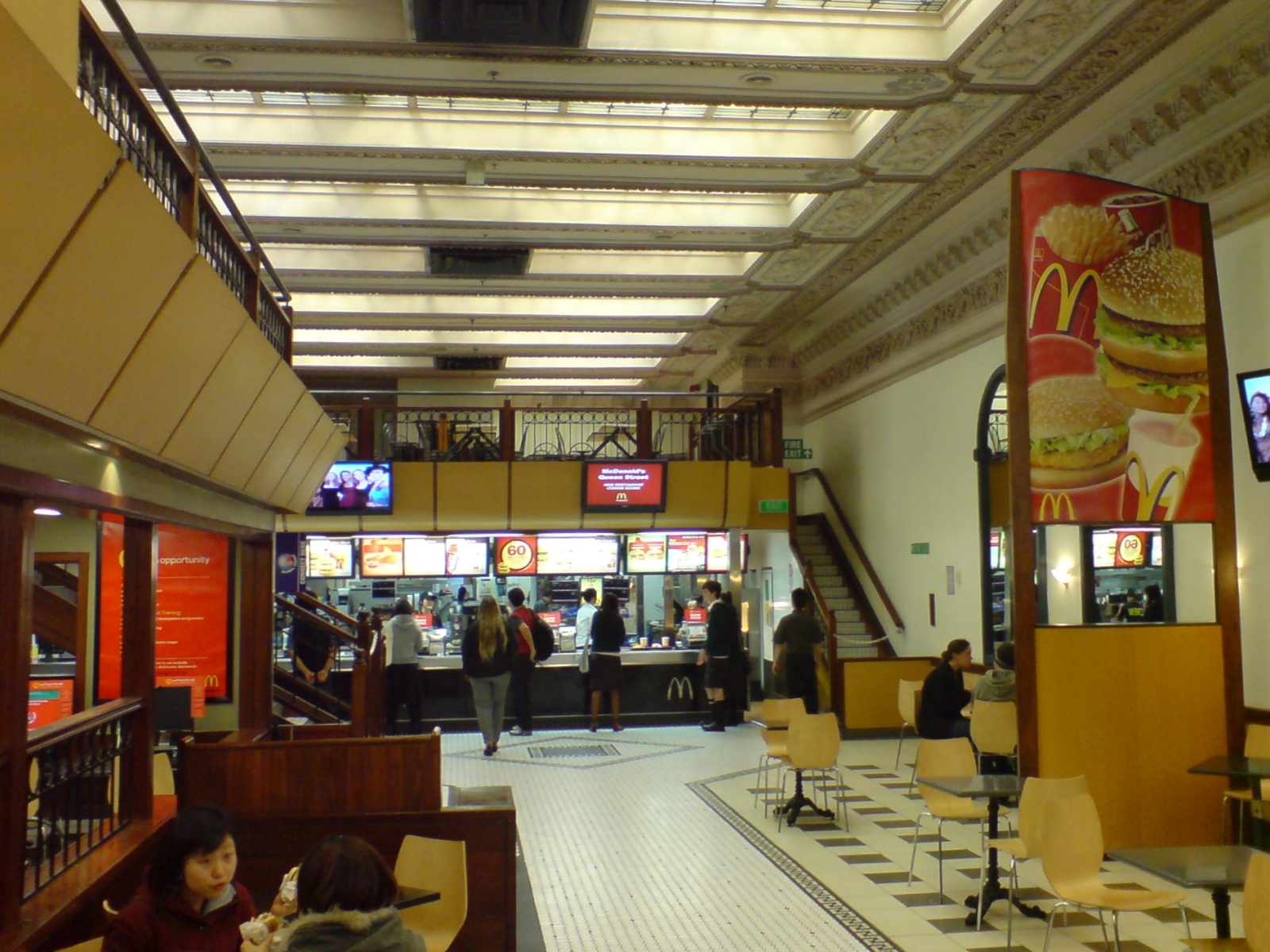
The Auckland Savings Bank Building on Queen Street, Auckland CBD, pictured in 2008. It contained a McDonalds restaurant from 1977 until it relocated nearby in 2020.

The second New Zealand restaurant opened in the old Auckland Savings Bank Building on Queen Street, Auckland in July 1977. Restaurants in New Lynn and Lower Hutt opened in 1978, being the first with drive-throughs. By the end of the decade, restaurants had also opened in Takapuna, Henderson, and Courtenay Place (central Wellington).

=== 1980s ===
By late 1987, there were 25 McDonald's restaurants across the North Island, in Whangārei, Auckland, Hamilton, Tauranga, Rotorua, Gisborne, Hastings, New Plymouth, Whanganui, Palmerston North, and Wellington.

The first South Island restaurants opened on 3 November 1987 at Merivale and Linwood in Christchurch. Problems finding franchisees meant the opening of the third restaurant at Riccarton was delayed until February 1988, while the franchisees of the Whangārei restaurant transferred south to the Merivale restaurant on the possibility of a second restaurant in the future. Both restaurants almost broke worldwide opening day records, just losing the title due to a poor exchange rate. A branch opened in Dunedin on 13 December 1988.

=== 1990s ===
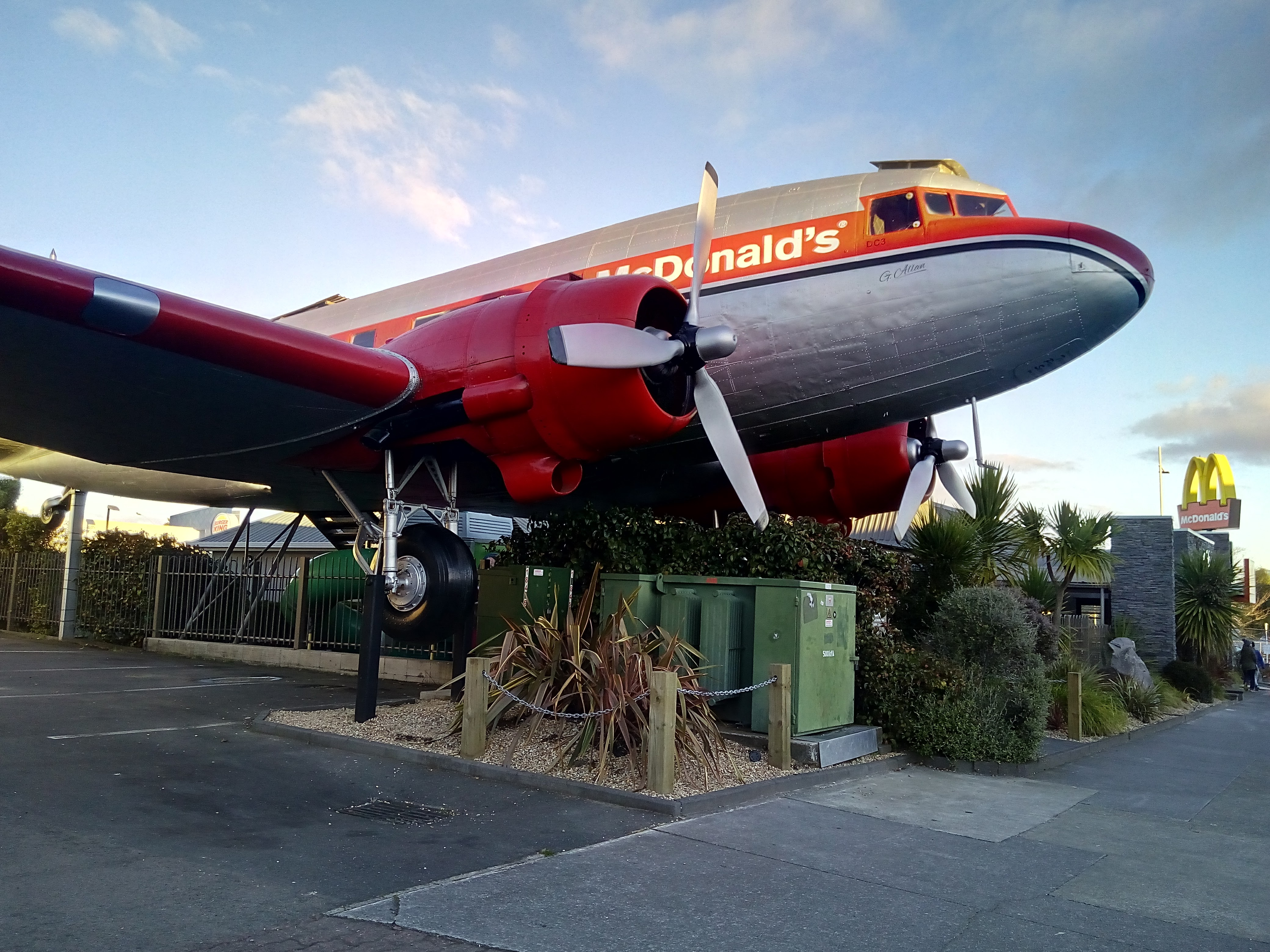
DC-3 plane attached to the McDonald's restaurant in Taupō (pictured in 2012)

In 1990, McDonald's purchased a former car yard site for its Taupō restaurant, which opened in November that year. The site came with a decommissioned Douglas DC-3 aircraft, complete with intact cockpit. The plane has become a tourist landmark, and now contains a seating area for diners.

The 50th New Zealand McDonald's restaurant opened in 1991 at Chartwell Square Mall, Hamilton. The 100th restaurant opened five years later at the Auckland University of Technology. Breakfast meals were introduced in the same year, first at the Auckland Queen Street restaurant before expanding nationally.

McDonald's purchased the fast-food chain Georgie Pie from Progressive Enterprises in 1996. The Georgie Pie chain closed in 1998, with half of the 32 restaurants converting to McDonald's and the remainder sold off. In 1998, New Zealand's first McCafé opened in the Queen Street restaurant.

From 1997 to 1999 the company endorsed McDonald's Young Entertainers, a televised talent show for young New Zealanders.

=== 2000s ===
In 2004, the Happy Meal children's menu celebrated 25 years since its introduction in 1979. In the same year, nutrition labelling was introduced to packaging on McDonald's core menu items.

In 2009, the original Porirua McDonald's restaurant in Cobham Court closed, replaced by a new restaurant with drive-through a short distance away in Kenepuru Drive.

=== 2010s ===
In May 2013, McDonald's announced it would bring Georgie Pie back on a trial basis, selling a single pie flavour through several McDonald's restaurants in the Upper North Island. Later in October, it announced it would roll out Georgie Pie to all McDonald's restaurants nationwide, excluding those who could not accommodate the necessary equipment. The Georgie Pie menu items were discontinued in September 2020.

==== Create your taste ====
In 2014 McDonald's introduced 'Create Your Taste' to New Zealand. The customer creates a gourmet burger from scratch on the touch-screen "kiosk" and the burger, fries and drink are delivered to them at their table. A related competition invited customers to submit their burger creations to the McDonald's website and relied on users to vote for their favourite design. The competition was pulled in July 2016 after website users created burgers with offensive names.

==== All Day Breakfast ====
Following the United States and Australia, McDonald's launched the All Day Breakfast menu in New Zealand on 4 May 2016. The menu consists of a limited range of breakfast products, which are:

- Hotcakes
- Hashbrown
- Bacon and Egg McMuffin
- Chicken McMuffin
- Chicken and Bacon McMuffin

All Day Breakfast was discontinued in 2021.

==== 40th Anniversary ====
McDonald's celebrated 40 years in New Zealand on 7 June 2016; the Queen Street Auckland restaurant marked the anniversary with 1970s retro service and items on the original menu sold at their 1976 prices. At that date, McDonald's had 166 restaurants operating in New Zealand; a 167th restaurant at Silverstream, Upper Hutt was closed awaiting rebuilding after it caught fire in February 2016.

==== Shooting at Upper Hutt store ====
A man was shot dead by police after firing a shot at the Upper Hutt McDonald's in 2015. He was later identified as Pera Smiler, 25 of Upper Hutt.

==== Te Reo Māori ====
In 2018, the Hastings restaurant became the first in the country to offer a menu written in te reo Māori.

==== Happy Meal Reader's Program (2019) ====
In February 2019, McDonald's extended its global Happy Meal Reader's Program to New Zealand where they added the choice of books with Happy Meal to encourage reading among children. They announced to give away 800,000 copies of Roald Dahl books over the course of 12 months, where they will introduce a new book each month.

=== 2020s ===
On 12 February 2025, McDonald's was denied a consent application to build a drive-through restaurant in Wanaka. The fast food chain was planning to build a 445 sq metre drive-through restaurant at the Wanaka-Luggate highway below Mount Iron. While McDonalds' had initially proposed that the restaurant operated 24 hours daily seven days a week, the chain downscaled its plans to a 6am-11pm daily opening with a reduced logo. The Queenstown Lakes District Council received over 350 submissions on the Wanaka restaurant, with 90% opposing the proposal. Commissioners declined the proposal, citing strong local opposition.

== Delivery ==
McDonald's announced McDelivery, a delivery service, would start being trialled in Auckland starting 20 July 2016 in New Lynn and Glenfield. All deliveries will require a $25 order and incur a $7.50 delivery fee.

As of 2025, McDonald's uses delivery partners such as Delivereasy, UberEats, and Doordash to deliver to customers

== Products ==
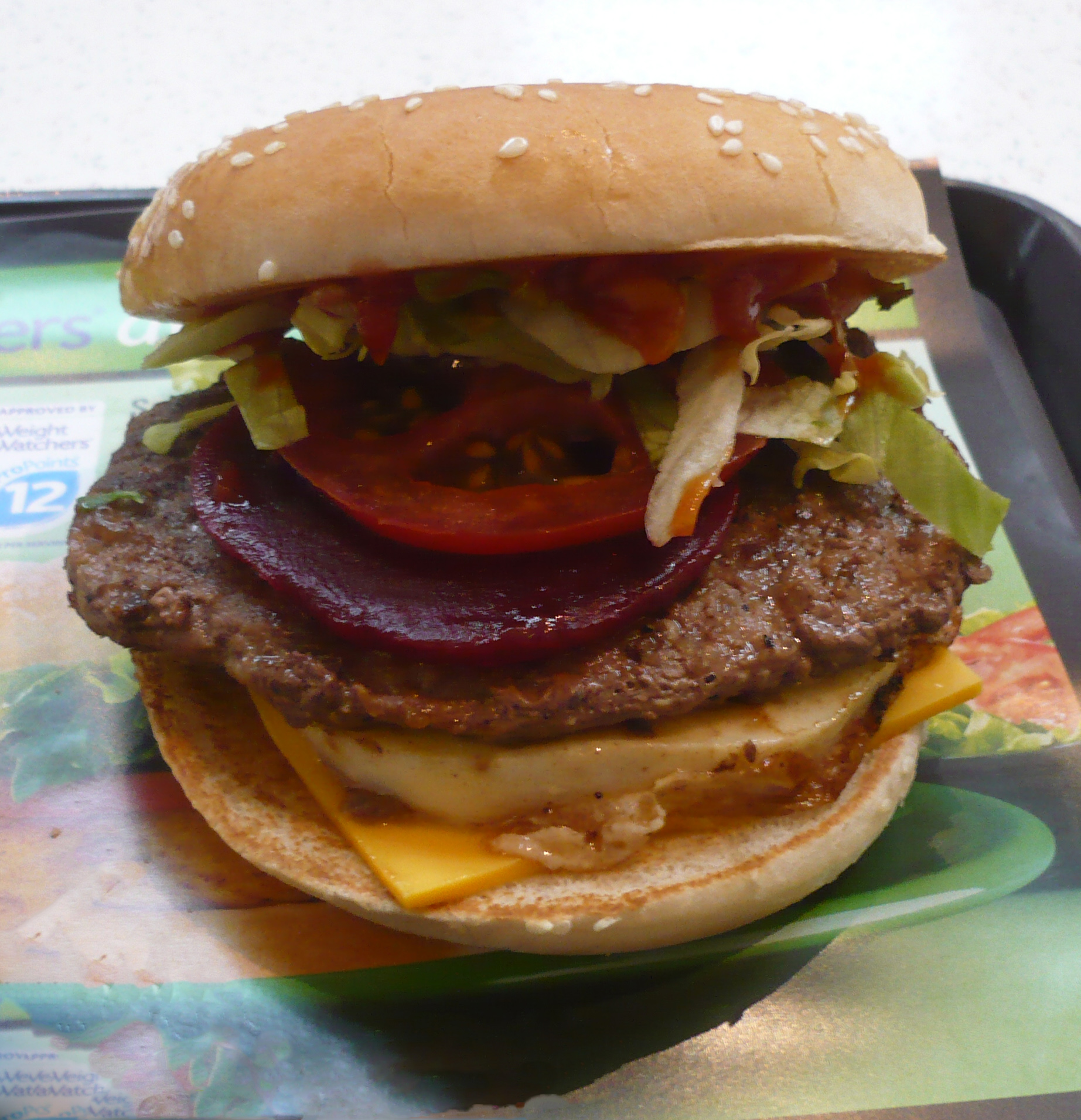
The McDonald's Kiwiburger

McDonald's New Zealand sells products consistent with its international markets – including the chain's signature product, the Big Mac. Items unique to the New Zealand menu include:

- Kiwiburger – A take on the classic New Zealand hamburger: quarter-pound beef patty, egg, lettuce, tomato, beetroot, onion, ketchup and mustard. Introduced in 1991 as a permanent menu item but withdrawn in 2004 due to complications with the egg and beetroot. It has returned as a limited-time item in 2007, 2009 and every year from 2011 to 2015 when it joined the long term menu again only to be discontinued in 2021. It made a brief reappearance as part of the 23/24 summer promotion.
- Massive McMuffin – bacon, egg, cheese, two sausage patties and ketchup between two English muffins.
- Georgie Pie – Discontinued in September 2020, a pie pastry filled with steak, mince and cheese or bacon and egg.
- The Boss – Discontinued in October 2025, two quarter-pound beef patties with lettuce, tomato, onion, ketchup, mustard, and mayonnaise. It had a slice of both American and Tasty cheese.
- Breakfast Bagels – Available in two forms. The NYC Benedict, which is dressed with hollandaise sauce, an egg, tasty cheese, and two slices of bacon. And BLT, which is dressed with a tomato slice, mayonnaise, shredded lettuce, and bacon.

In 2016, McDonald's bought more than NZ$150 million worth of local produce for its New Zealand restaurants.

In 2018, the limited-time Cookie Time McFlurry was available a week prior to launch on Uber Eats.

== Franchisees and employment relations ==
McDonald's New Zealand has union representation. This has led to demands for equal pay with other fast food sector employees, such as those in KFC. There were also protests about favouritism of police officers and the accused harassment of one member staff for being gay. The demand for higher wages ultimately led to a strike which began on 22 May 2013 in the Bunny St McDonald's in Wellington.

In May 2013, the National Government reintroduced a youth minimum wage for 16- and 17-year-olds at 80 percent of the adult minimum wage. McDonald's was one of seven major companies employing young people to reject a youth minimum wage and insisting young employees be paid at least the adult minimum wage.

== See also ==
- List of hamburger restaurants
- List of companies of New Zealand

== Bibliography ==
- Hepözden, Rosemary (2011). O'Flaherty, Brian (ed.). Golden Arches under Southern Skies: Celebrating 35 years of McDonald's in New Zealand. in co-op with McDonald's Restaurants (NZ) Ltd. Auckland: Renaissance Publishing. ISBN 978-0-9864521-1-6.
