= Georgie Pie =

Defunct New Zealand fast food chain

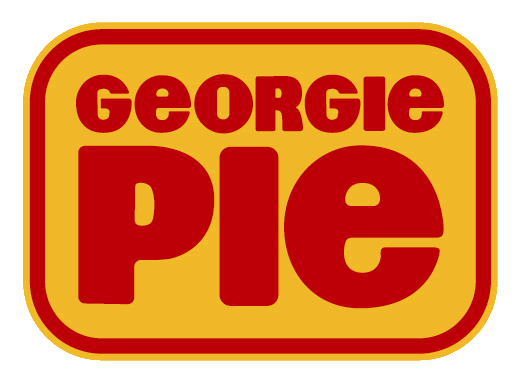
- Original logo
- Type: Subsidiary
- Industry: Fast food
- Founded: December 6, 1977; 48 years ago
- Founder: Tom Ah Chee
- Defunct: November 19, 1998; 27 years ago
- Fate: Acquired by McDonald's
- Headquarters: Auckland, New Zealand
- Number of locations: 32 (at peak)
- Products: Meat pies, fried pies, french fries, desserts, soft drinks
- Parent: McDonald's

Georgie Pie was a fast food chain owned by retailer Progressive Enterprises specialising in meat pies that hoped to be New Zealand's own homegrown alternative to the global fast-food industry giants such as McDonald's, Pizza Hut and Burger King. The first Georgie Pie restaurant opened in 1977, and at its peak there were 32 restaurants across New Zealand. After running into financial difficulties, it was bought out by McDonald's in 1996, mainly for its restaurant locations. The last Georgie Pie store was closed in 1998.

Large pies at Georgie Pie came in a range of traditional (mince and cheese/steak and kidney) and international (Chinese/Mexican/Italian) flavours. In 2013, following frequent calls for the brand's return, McDonald's reintroduced Georgie Pie through its restaurants. It was discontinued in 2020.

== History ==
Georgie Pie was the brainchild of Tom Ah Chee, who opened New Zealand's first supermarket (Foodtown Ōtāhuhu, 1958). Ah Chee had made an unsuccessful bid for the New Zealand rights to McDonald's before deciding to establish his own fast food restaurant chain. The first restaurant was opened in Kelston, Auckland in 1977. In 1994, plans were announced to open 25 new outlets per year, with a goal of 114 operating restaurants by the end of 1998. The chain came to prominence in the early 1990s with its $1, $2, $3, and $4 "Funtastic Value" menu. At its peak, the chain employed about 1,300 people. Georgie Pie was able to automate the food production process far more than chains which sold labour-intensive items such as burgers. Timing was a more difficult detail, for Georgie Pie, as it took 22 minutes to bake a pie versus a few minutes for typical fast food.

== Closure ==
Following the decision not to continue expansion of the brand, inquiries (by members of the Georgie Pie management team and other outside interested parties) into buying the brand were declined. Progressive Enterprises sold the chain to McDonald's in 1996, who mainly bought the chain for its property, which included high-profile sites such as the corner of Great South Road and Green Lane East in Auckland. It also gave McDonald's a leg-up over arch-rival Burger King, who entered the New Zealand market in 1994 and were also actively interested in purchasing the Georgie Pie chain. At the conclusion of the deal, 17 outlets were converted into McDonald's restaurants. The other fifteen were sold, some to other fast food franchises or restaurants, one to a Bunnings and one to a blood bank. The last Georgie Pie was located at Kepa Road in Mission Bay where they ceased operations in 1998. The Foodtown/Countdown house brand "Foodtown" pies, which tasted nearly the same as Georgie Pies, were withdrawn in late 2004.

During the course of its twenty-one years in business, Georgie Pie achieved a number of firsts in New Zealand: first drive-thru and first with breakfast; first 24-hour drive-thru; and the first domestic concept to seriously challenge the international fast food giants.

== Resurgence in popularity ==
New Zealand Broadcasting School students Drig Chappells and Gareth Thorne started a Facebook group calling for the return of Georgie Pie. In September 2008, as part of a documentary known as "Bring Back the George", they temporarily converted a Christchurch bakery into the restaurant and sold pies made with the same recipe as the originals. All of their pies were sold in less than an hour, with people coming from as far as Auckland to get one. "Bring Back Georgie Pie" badges and T-shirts were available from a Wellington-based "Kiwiana" retailer until McDonald's identified intellectual property concerns and requested that their manufacture cease.

A shop selling pies by the name "GP Pies" also opened in Kelston, West Auckland. McDonald's announced they were looking into possible copyright infringement of the name. They also announced they were looking into relaunching the Georgie Pie brand, not as a stand-alone shop, but possibly inside McDonald's outlets as a McCafé offering.

In May 2009, July 2011, and April 2012, media reports indicated that McDonald's New Zealand (the current trademark holder) were investigating a reopening of the brand. Nationwide radio station ZM even offered McDonald's $50,000 worth of free advertising if the stores were to reopen before the end of 2009.

Occasionally, genuine Georgie Pies came onto the market, usually through New Zealand auction site Trade Me.

== Relaunch ==
On 9 May 2013, McDonald's announced the return of Georgie Pie on a trial basis. From 5 June 2013, the original recipe Steak Mince 'n' Cheese pie (minus the monosodium glutamate) has been sold for $4.50 at the Queen Street and Greenlane McDonald's restaurants (the latter being a former Georgie Pie restaurant) in Auckland. The trial was quickly expanded to five more McDonald's restaurants in Auckland (including at Kelston, the location of the original Georgie Pie restaurant), three restaurants in Hamilton, and the Te Awamutu restaurant. The relaunch proved so popular that special queues and security staff were brought in to handle the crowds. At times, the lines went out of the restaurant and stretched across the car park. In July 2013, the trial was expanded to four more Auckland restaurants, as well as two restaurants in Palmerston North, and restaurants in Feilding and Bulls.

On 1 October 2013, McDonald's announced that the trial exceeded its expectations, and it would subsequently expand Georgie Pie to 107 of its 161 restaurants nationwide by the end of 2013 and introduce two new flavours of pie in early 2014. It was expected that by mid-2014 all McDonald's restaurants in New Zealand, except those which cannot accommodate the pie ovens, would be selling Georgie Pie.

McDonald's New Zealand had a 5.8 percent gain in sales in 2013, which has been largely attributed to the re-introduction of Georgie Pie.

On 5 March 2014, the Chicken 'n' Vegetable pie was re-introduced to the menu.

== Retirement ==
On 8 June 2020, it was announced that Georgie Pie was to be discontinued within weeks, citing a lack of demand for the product. McDonald's stated that the oven equipment would need "significant reinvestment to replace".

In September 2020, the purported "last box" of Georgie Pies was auctioned off for more than its retail price on Trade Me, attracting four-figure bids. In March 2024, Stuff.co.nz reported that a single frozen George Pie from 2020 was sold for $45 on Trade Me.
