= Pepco (disambiguation) =

Pepco usually refers to the Potomac Electric Power Company.

Pepco or PEPCO may also refer to:

- Pakistan Electric Power Company
- Pepco (retailer), a Poland-based variety store chain

== See also ==
- Pep&Co
