= EuroGeneral =

Variety store chain located in Ireland

EuroGeneral Ltd.

- Trade name: EuroGiant
- Industry: Retail and wholesale
- Founded: 30 April 1990; 36 years ago in Dublin, Ireland
- Defunct: 4 February 2026; 9 months ago
- Fate: Entered liquidation
- Headquarters: Dublin, Ireland
- Number of locations: 77
- Key people: Charlie O'Loughlin (CEO); Louise O'Loughlin
- Revenue: ▲€60.7 million (2014)
- Number of employees: 644
- Website: eurogeneral.ie; eurogiant.ie

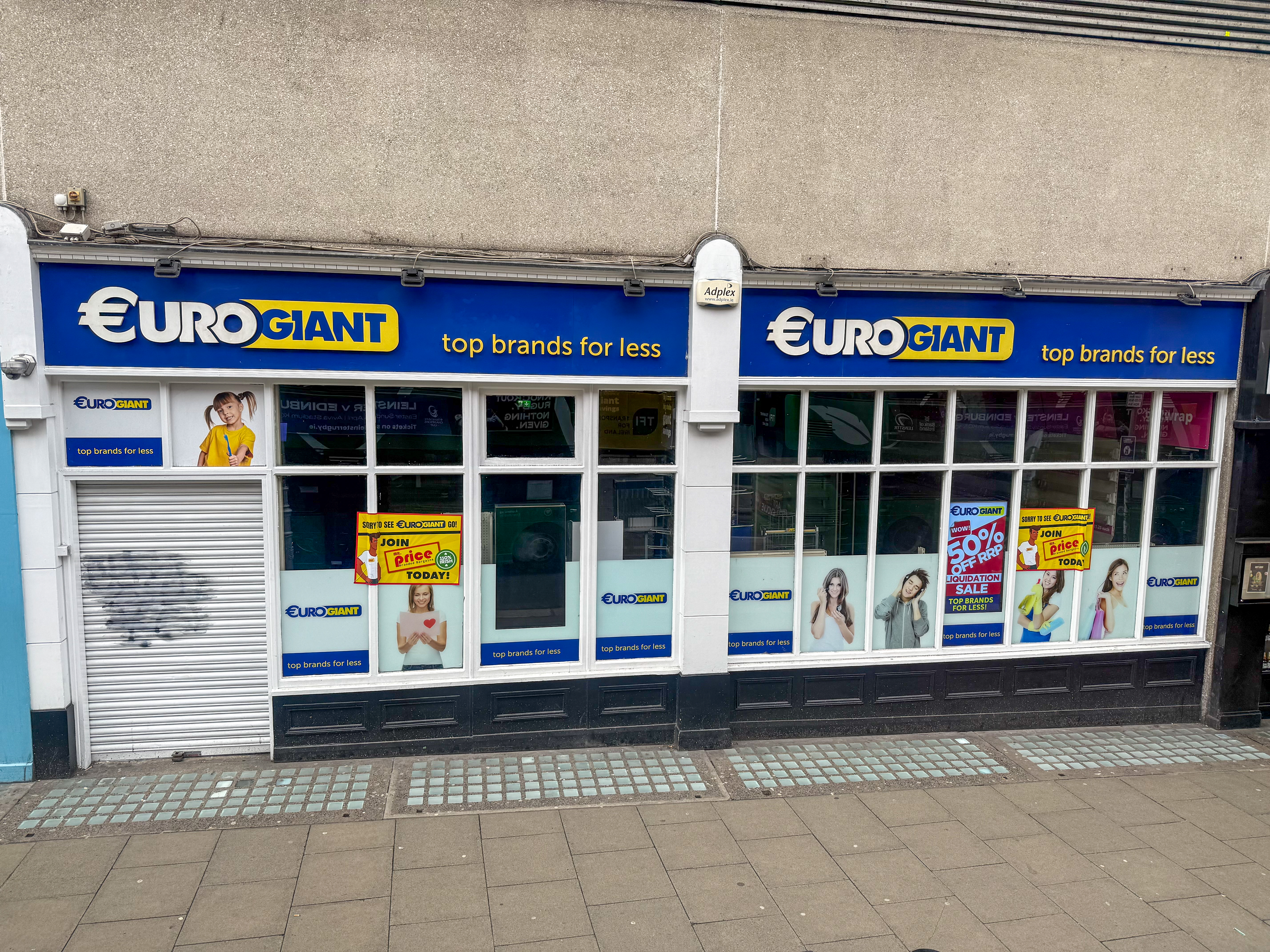
A EuroGiant store in Dublin, with the sign "Join Mr. Price", March 2026

EuroGeneral was a retailer that operated the EuroGiant discount shop chain in Ireland, until its liquidation on 4th of February, 2026. Its main competitors were Dealz and Mr Price.

== History ==
The company was founded on 30 April 1990 by Charlie O'Loughlin when he opened his first variety shop, "PoundCity" on Moore Street in Dublin. The business expanded, and by 1993, it had twelve shops, in Dublin, Cork and Limerick. In 2001, EuroGeneral was set up and "PoundCity" was renamed "Euro 2" due to the introduction of the euro in 2002. The Euro 2 shops were later renamed "EuroGiant". The business had expanded to more than 60 shops nationwide by 2012, and to more than 80 by 2023.

On 4 February 2026, a provisional liquidator was appointed to EuroGeneral Limited after several years of loss-making, with the EuroGiant shops to continue operating pending the carrying out of a full review of its network.

== Operations ==
EuroGeneral has two main divisions, retail and wholesale. The business employs over 500 employees. The retail shops are all privately operated by EuroGeneral Ltd and Bushgrove Ltd.

EuroGeneral's wholesale division also supplies other retailers - over 400 other retail outlets within Ireland and mainland Europe. EuroGeneral claims to be Ireland's leading online wholesaler for discount and convenience shops.

== Liquidation ==
On the 4th and 5th of February, 2026, EuroGiant entered liquidation.This meant that 640 jobs were at risk, and all closures of their stores had taken place in February. 640 jobs were lost, and all stores closed on one date, leaving dozens of spaces to let rental/to buy spaces across the country.
