= DealZ =

Dealz may refer to:

== People ==
- Member of the Jackson family

== Company ==
- Dealz - a fixed-price discount retailer in the Republic of Ireland and Spain and Denmark
  - Poundland - the parent company of Dealz
- Dealz.com - A Coupon and Deal website in the United States.
