= Mr Price =

Mr Price is a name used by retail chains in multiple countries:

- Mr Price (Ireland)
- Mr Price Group (South Africa)
