= Moore Street =

Street in central Dublin, Ireland

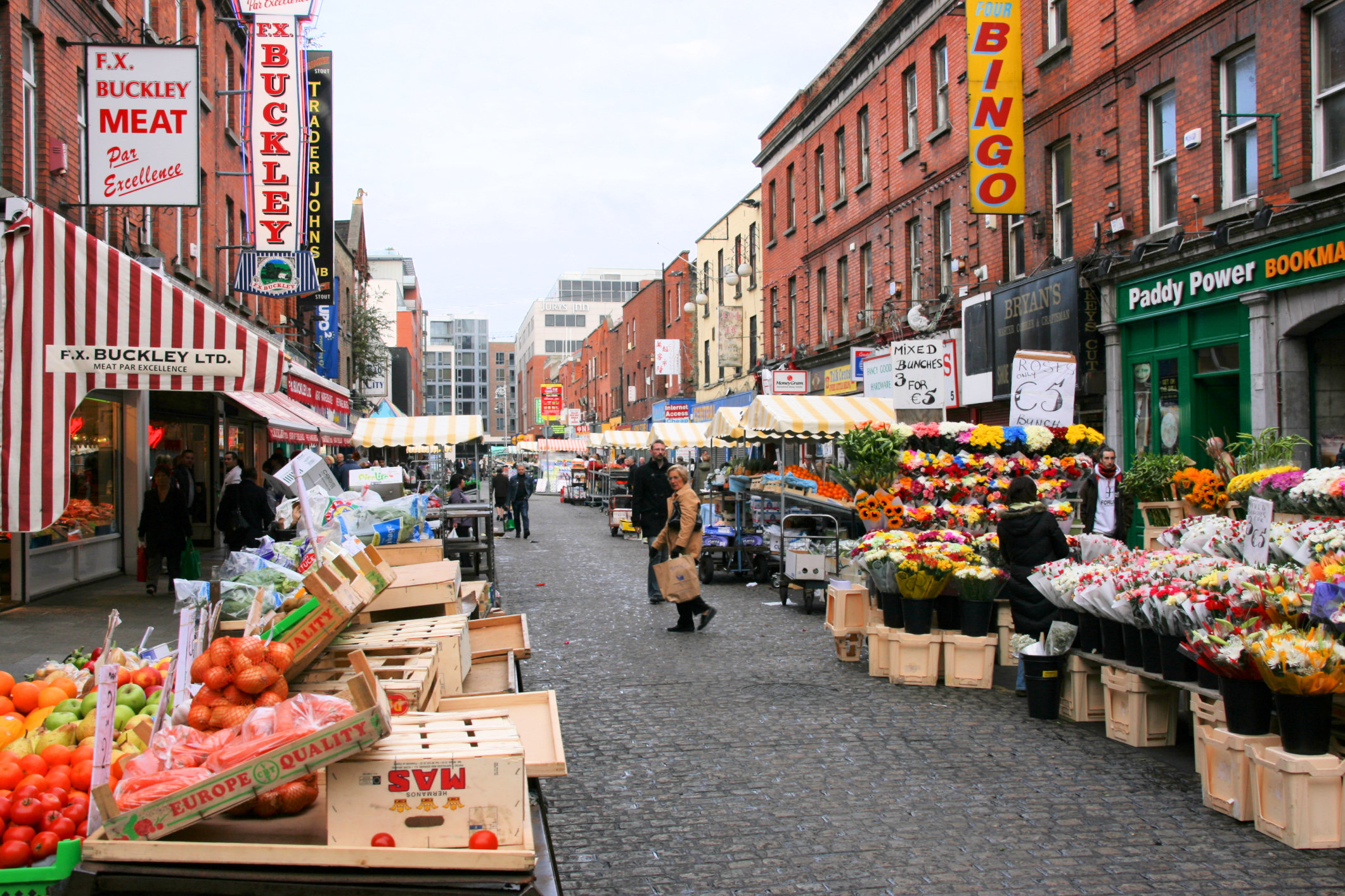
- Market stalls

- Location within Central Dublin
- Native name: Sráid an Mhúraigh (Irish)
- Namesake: Henry Moore, 1st Earl of Drogheda
- Length: 240 m (790 ft)
- Width: 14 metres (46 ft)
- Location: Dublin, Ireland
- Postal code: D01
- Coordinates: 53°21′00″N 6°15′45″W
- north end: Parnell Street
- south end: Henry Street

Other
- Known for: market, Easter Rising

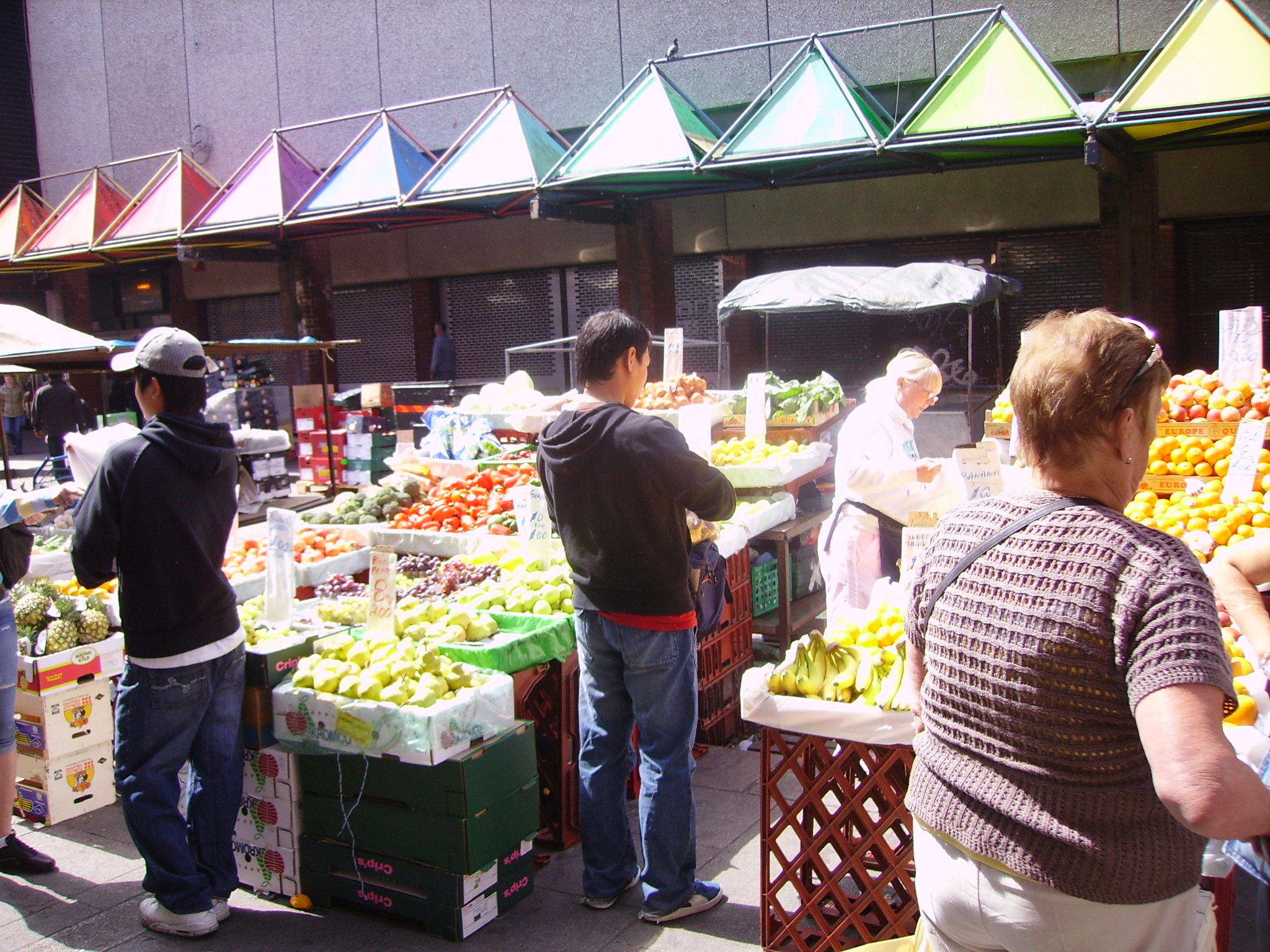
Fruit stalls on Moore Street

Moore Street (/ˈmʊər/; Irish: Sráid Uí Mhúraigh) is a street in central Dublin, Ireland, off Henry Street, one of Ireland's main shopping streets. The famous Moore Street open-air fruit and vegetable market is Dublin's oldest food market. The market there is a famous landmark on the northside of the city.

== History ==
Moore Street was named after Henry Moore, 1st Earl of Drogheda, who developed the street along with adjacent streets, Henry Street, Earl Street, Of Lane (now Henry Place), Drogheda Street (now O'Connell Street), and Mellifont Lane (now Cathedral Street).

Tayto crisps was established in May 1954 in two rented rooms on O'Rahilly's Parade, off Moore Street.

Artist and documenter of Dublin in the 1960s, Flora Mitchell, commented that "In the days when this was the fashionable quarter of Dublin, here was the main shopping district, but gradually it became an open market, radiating out into courts and lanes filled with booths and stalls. Moore Street today suffers from periodic threatening of closure, but much trading is done here, and the street is a riot of colour and noise." Moore Street was once part of a larger commercial area. The north-western side of the street is now dominated by the Ilac Centre shopping complex, built in 1981. The smaller streets that were built over by the shopping centre included Little Denmark Street, Cole's Lane, Anglesea Market and Riddell's Row.

== Easter Rising ==
Irish Volunteers commanded by Patrick Pearse surrendered to British forces on 30 April 1916, from a terrace on the street at the end of the Easter Rising. Michael Collins and five of the seven signatories of the Irish Proclamation of Independence—Patrick Pearse, James Connolly, Thomas Clarke, Joseph Plunkett, Seán Mac Diarmada—surrendered from the terrace.

=== Planning controversy ===
From 1996, Dublin City Council planned to demolish the terrace in order to redevelop the area, but this was opposed by groups who held this terrace and the battlefield trail running from the GPO down Moore Lane and Henry Street and into Moore Street to be an important part of Irish history, some referring to the location as "Ireland's Alamo". The National Graves Association began its campaign in 2002 after being alerted to the removal of a commemorative plaque from the facade of no. 16 by Patrick Cooney, which led to setting up the "Save 16 Moore Street committee" in 2005. Numbers 14-17 Moore Street were declared a national monument in 2007, guaranteeing their retention.

However, plans for a €1.25 billion retail and residential scheme on nearby O'Connell Street, intended to be built by Joe O'Reilly (CE of the Chartered Land Group, which developed the Dundrum Town Centre), are controversial. At Easter Rising commemorations in April 2009, opponents of the scheme contended that it would involve major alterations to numbers 14-17 and pledged to challenge it at forthcoming public hearings.

Objectors, including families of the signatories of the Irish Proclamation of Independence, have pledged to seek an EU ruling to preserve the terrace if the developer's plan to subsume it and Moore Lane into the planned mall surrounding the GPO is waved through by the Irish Government. In November 2012, the legal representative for relatives of the 1916 leaders told the Joint Committee on the Environment, Transport, Culture and the Gaeltacht that Chartered Land accepted that it does not have the money to build the development due to the developer's debts. In the meantime, the interior and exterior of the houses have reportedly deteriorated badly. In January 2013, a report by the Technical Group of Irish parliamentary representatives called for the Moore Street quarter to be saved and opposed the shopping mall plan.

In August 2015, Chartered Land proposed to swap Nos.14-17 (which had a preservation order on them since 2007) for Nos. 24-25, which were owned by the local authority distributed leaflets and lobbied elected Councillors. Following strategic lobbying by the Save Moore Street Committee which included relatives of the 1916 executed leaders, the proposal was defeated by a large majority at a Dublin City Council meeting in November of that year. In September of 2015, the State agency NAMA sold Chartered Land's property assets via auction to Hammerson (British) and Allianz (German). However, in March 2015 it was announced in the media that the State had purchased Nos. 14-17 from Chartered Land for a total of €4 million, and would be preparing a museum there in preparation for the centenary commemorations of the Rising in the following year.

In January 2016 the Save Moore Street Committee was monitoring the buildings on a daily basis and saw that demolition work was about to begin. Despite a continued campaign of trying to engage with the minister, legal action was triggered by campaigners. In tandem with the action the houses were occupied by protesters from a variety of political backgrounds and held for five days.

A long-time Save Moore Street campaigner, Colm Moore, supported by the committee and 1916 relatives took a number of legal challenges on State decisions regarding the street to the High Court. Justice Max Barrett gave an interim order that no demolition take place until the case had been heard and the occupiers left the building. Subsequently, after hearing heavy machinery at work within the buildings and the refusal of the Minister of Heritage to permit independent inspection of the work, refusing access to a delegation of members of the Irish parliament and the Lord Mayor of Dublin, activists of the Save Moore Street 2016 campaign group, which had arisen out of the occupation, blockaded the site and prevented building workers gaining access. The blockade was maintained for almost six weeks and was lifted only with the delivery of the Barrett judgement. On 18 March, having heard the case of Mr. Moore and the State's defence, Justice Barrett declared that not only the whole terrace but the surrounding street and lanes constituted a national historic 1916 Battleground.

The Minister of Heritage, Heather Humphreys, with the support of the Government cabinet, lodged an appeal against this decision, the hearing of which was scheduled for late December 2017.

The Save Moore Street 2016 campaign group has also organised a number of public events. Campaigners and traders have claimed that the street market is being run down deliberately.

The city was set to provide hot and cold running water but then started revoking stall permits due to lack of hot and cold running water.

Moore Street trader Siobhan Hegarty's funeral procession down Moore Street received shutters pulled down and stalls paused business as a mark of respect, after her body was found on a beach in north county Dublin.

== In popular culture ==
Moore Street market is shown in the 2014 film Mrs. Brown's Boys D'Movie. The title character of Mrs. Brown is shown to run a family-owned market, passed down from the eldest daughter since 1802. The market comes under threat from developers who wish to turn the street into a giant shopping centre.

Moore Street was the subject of the second CIVIC LIFE film by filmmakers Joe Lawlor and Christine Molloy, starring members of the Dublin-based African production company, Arambe.

In 2026, Moore Street was the subject of the RTÉ One documentary series Welcome to Moore Street.

== Commercial ecosystem ==
On Moore Street and steps away, there are at least 12 phone repair and sales shops, Asian food stores, and meat stores.

Aldi and Lidl, EuroGiant and Dealz, Nisbets TK Maxx and Ilac Centre shopping centre entrance are there.

== See also ==
- Fishamble Street
- Rosanna Johnson
