= Pepco (retailer) =

European variety and discount store chain

- Pepco logo
- Type: Public
- Industry: Discount store
- Predecessor: Poundstretcher (Poland only)
- Founded: 2004; 22 years ago
- Headquarters: Poznań, Poland
- Number of locations: 3500 (2024)
- Key people: Stephan Borchert (President of the Management Board)
- Products: consumer goods, clothing, DIY, electrical items, home goods, toys
- Revenue: €1.98 bn (March 2024)
- Owner: Pepco Group
- Number of employees: 25,000 (2024)
- Website: pepco.eu

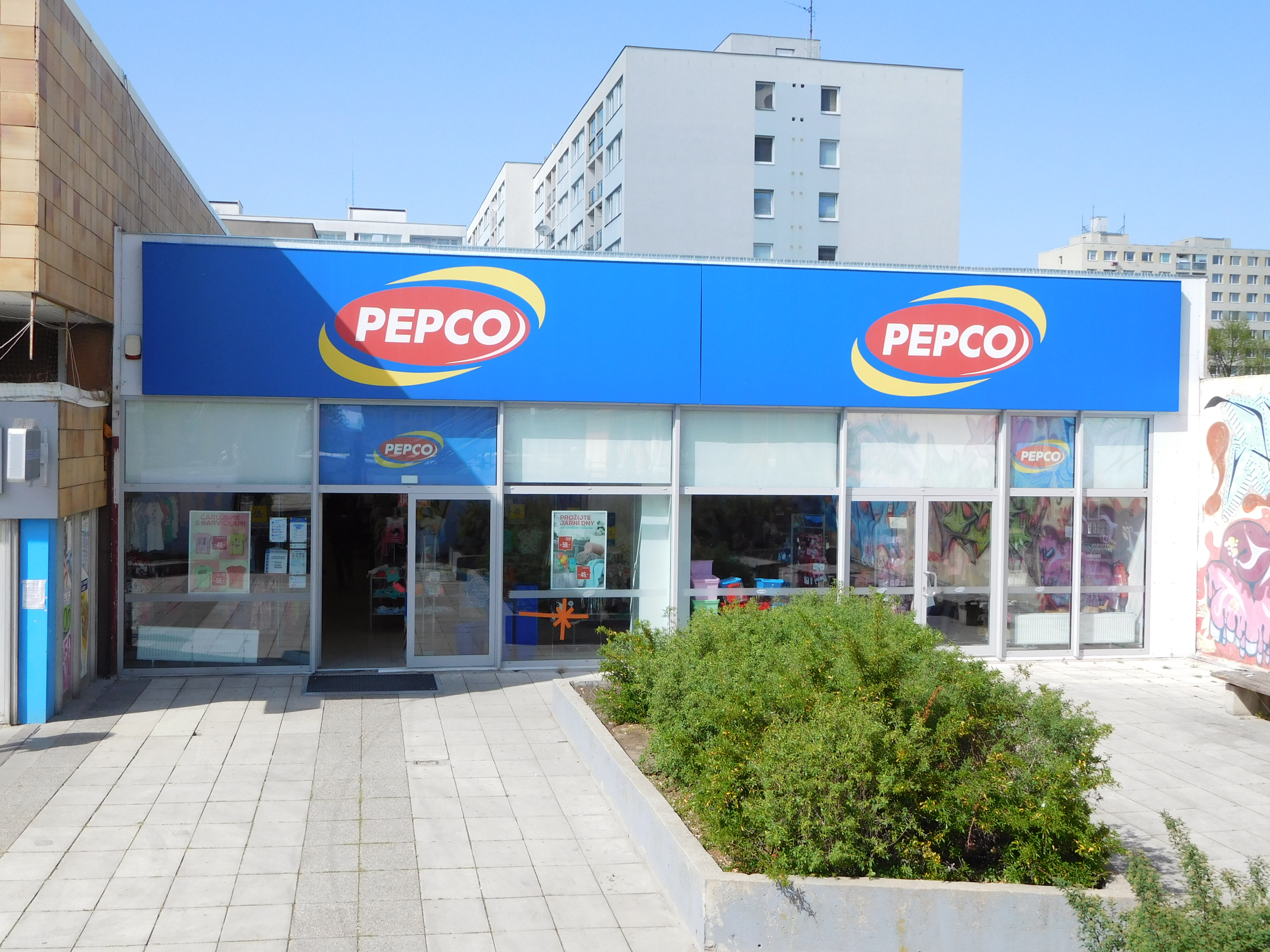
Pepco shop in Prague, Czech Republic with the former logotype, April 2019

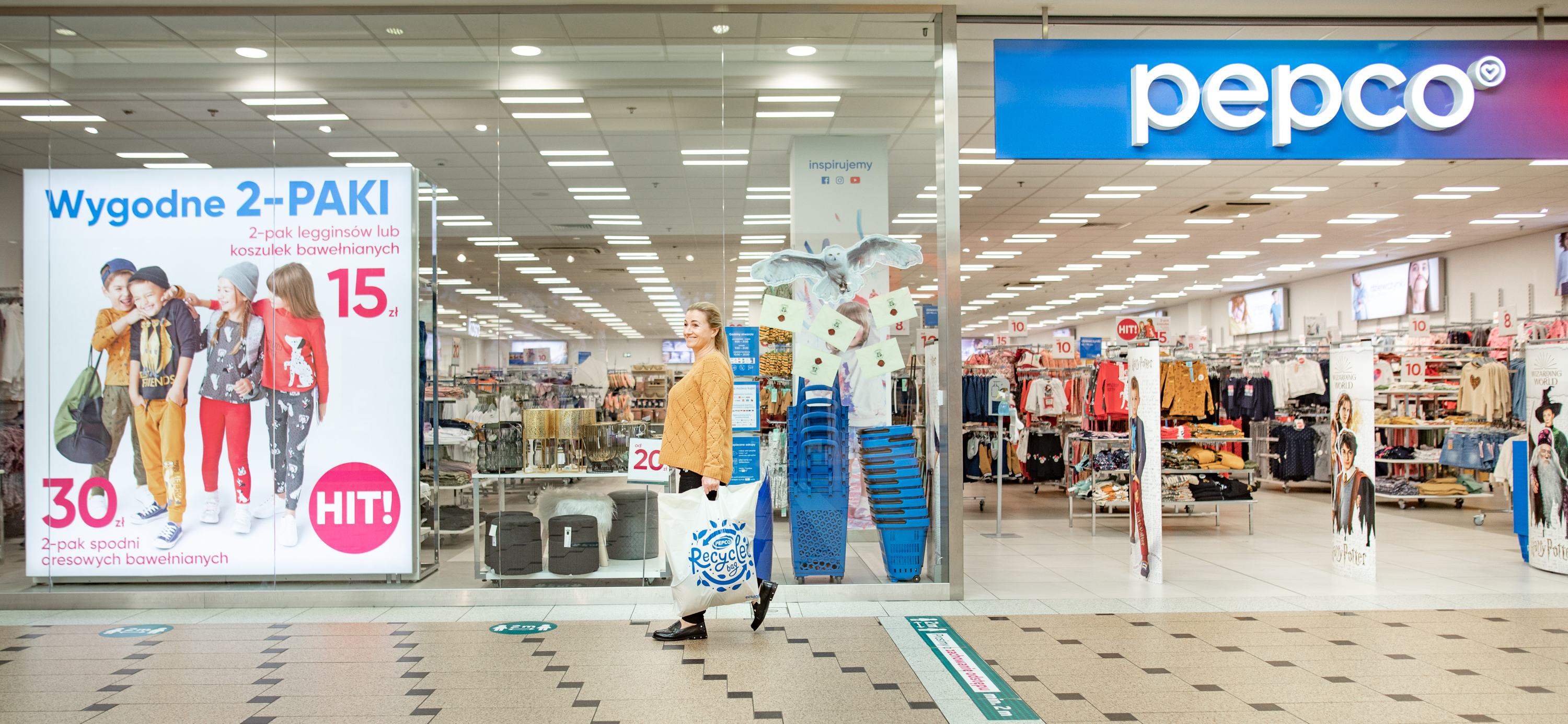
Pepco shop in a shopping centre in Poznań, Poland with the current logotype, August 2021

Pepco is a Polish discount variety retailer chain with shops across Europe. It is part of the London headquartered and Polish listed Pepco Group. Pepco shops account for most of the group's shops with 3500 branches across Europe (out of a total of 4600), and has replaced Dealz (in format and brand) completely in most European countries, except for Poland, Ireland and the Isle of Man. Pepco filed for bankruptcy in 2025 only in Germany.

== History ==
In 1999, the British retail conglomerate Brown & Jackson plc expanded into Poland, where they opened Poundstretcher shops in the country. Following poor performance, B&J Poland was sold to South African firm Tradegro in 2002 and was taken over by Pepkor in 2004. Following the takeover, the businesses and Poundstretcher shops were rebranded to Pepco.

From 2013 onwards, Pepco began to expand into other European markets:

- 2013 – opened shops in the Czech Republic and Slovakia
- 2015 – opened shops in Romania and Hungary
- 2017 – opened shops in Croatia, Slovenia and Lithuania
- 2018 – opened shops in Latvia and Estonia
- 2019 – opened shops in Bulgaria
- 2020 – opened shops in Italy and Serbia
- 2021 – opened shops in Spain and Austria
- 2022 – opened shops in Germany, Greece and Ireland
- 2023 – opened shops in Portugal, Bosnia and Herzegovina, and Azerbaijan
- 2026 - opened shops in North Macedonia and Ukraine

In 2023, the majority (79%) shareholder of Pepco, Steinhoff International was delisted and restructured in a plan to avoid bankruptcy following years of lawsuits and heavy losses after accounting problems were exposed in December 2017. Any bankruptcy was however not expected to harm Pepco given its strong balance sheet and independent sources of finance. Following the 2023 restructure, Steinhoff's shareholding was transferred to the new entity Ibex Topco B.V.

In March 2025, Pepco's parent company Pepco Group announced that they would be mostly focusing on the retailer from now on, trying to separate Poundland, the group will also try to sell Dealz.

In June 2025, Pepco Group sold Poundland and the Irish business of Dealz to Gordon Brothers for a nominal one pound sterling. Pepco retains a minority shareholding of the new Poundland group.

== In Poundland and Dealz ==
Since 2023 Poundland and Dealz shops have been phasing out their brand and previous "Pep&Co" branded products and clothing, replacing them with Pepco branded ranges. This transition was seen as a potential cause for a dip in like-for-like sales at the group in 2024.

In the United Kingdom, Pepco products are marketed as being "only at Poundland".

== Gallery ==
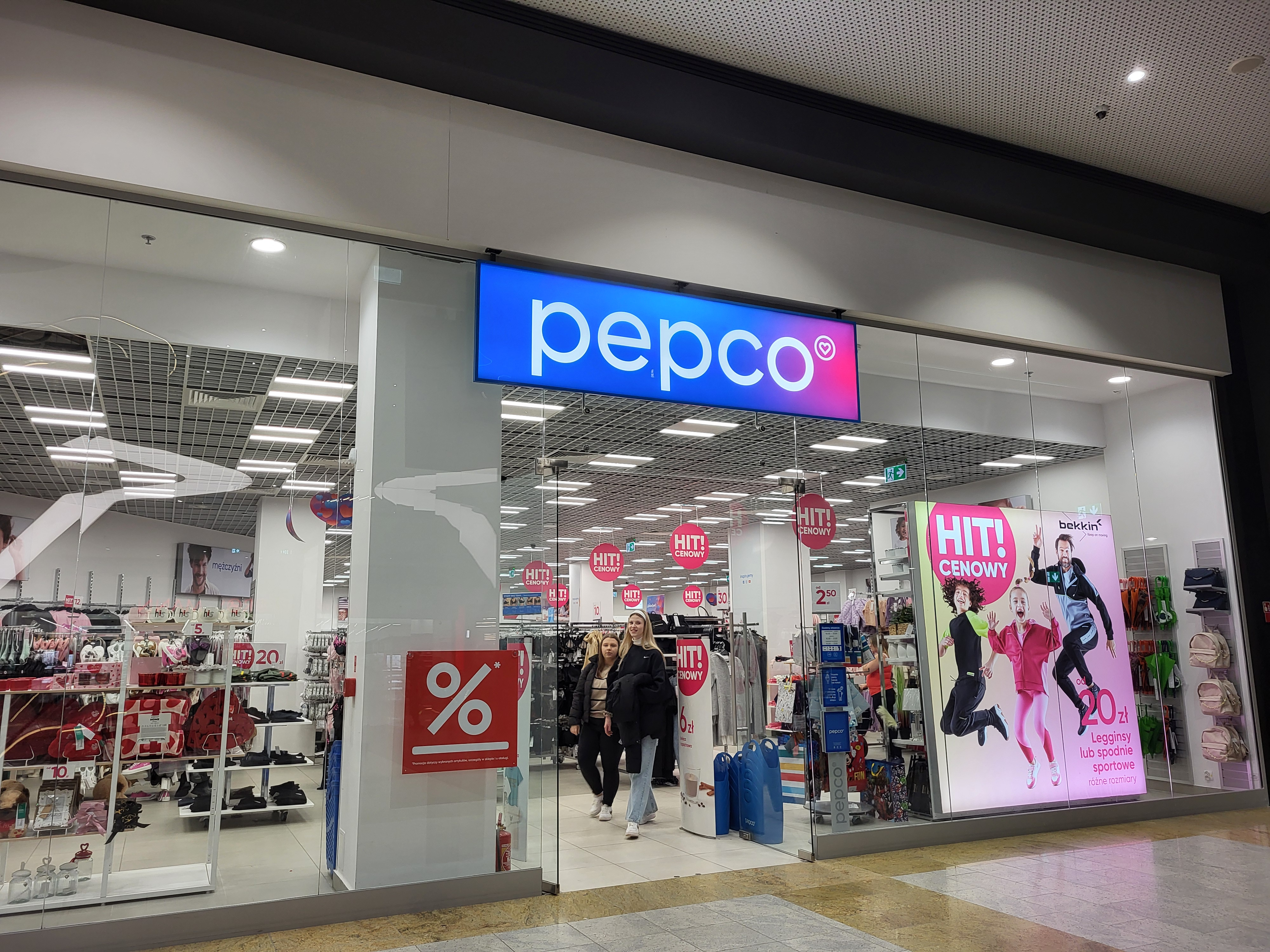
A Pepco store in a shopping center in Kraków

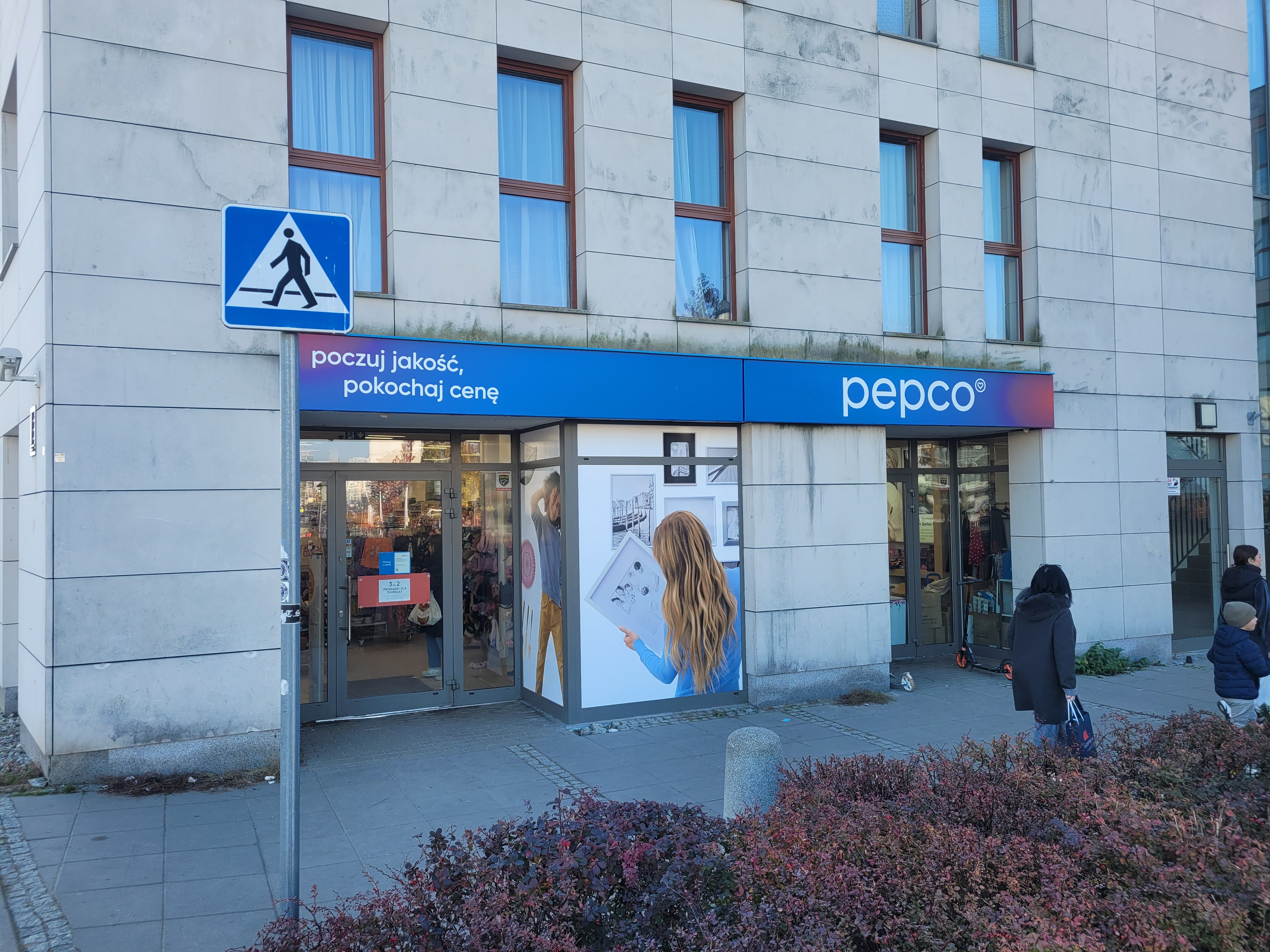
A Pepco store in Wilanów

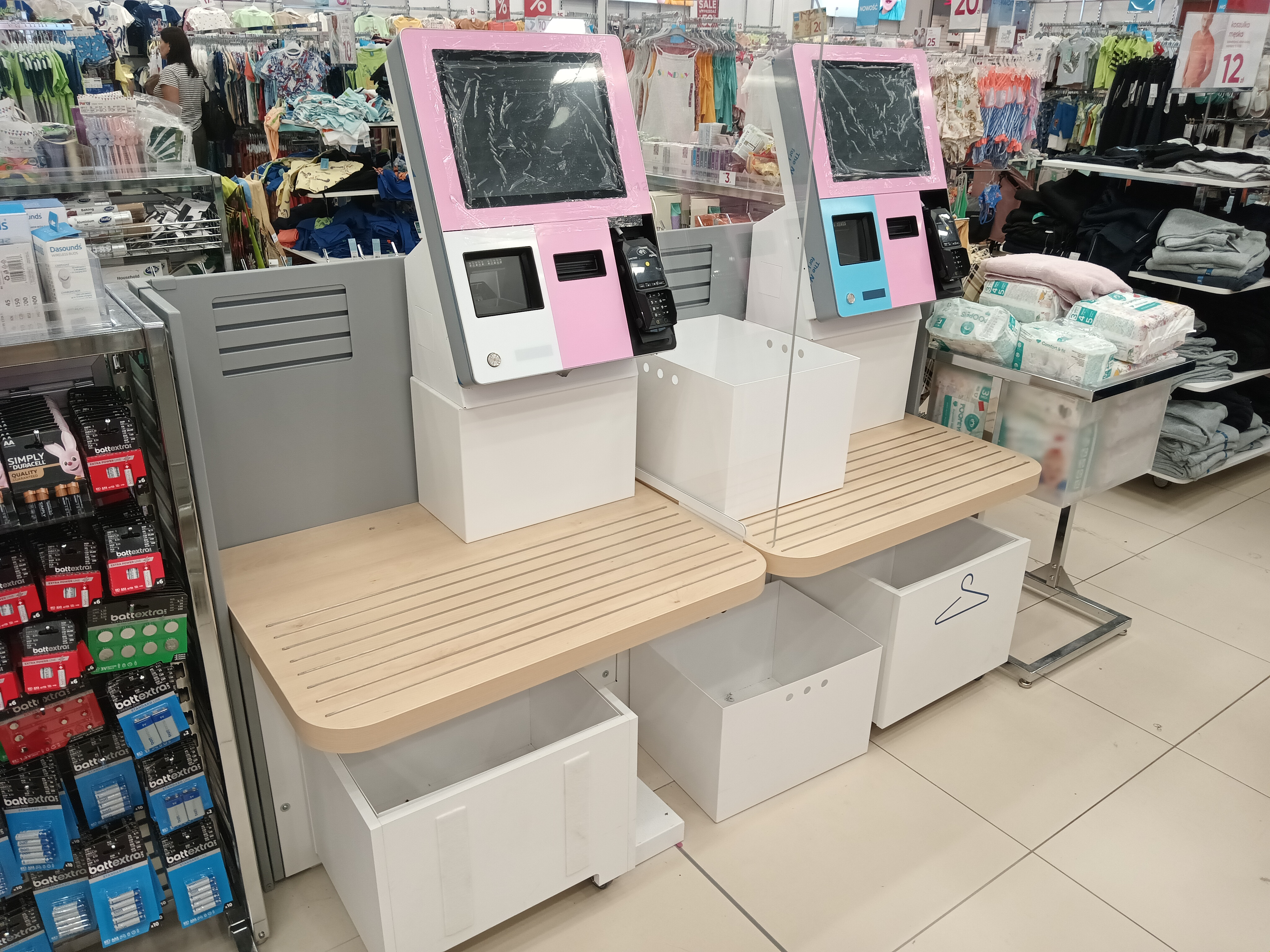
A self-service machine in a Pepco store in Tomaszów Mazowiecki
