= Fulton's Foods =

UK Grocery Store Chain, closed 2022

Fulton's Foods Limited
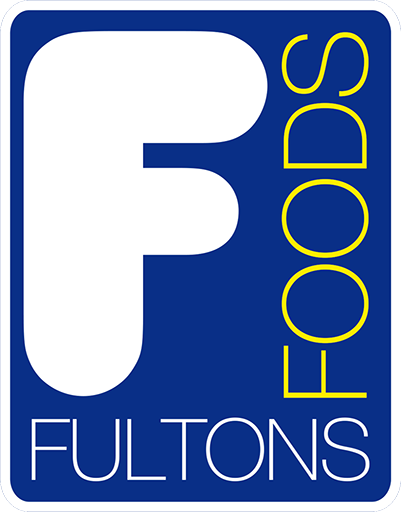

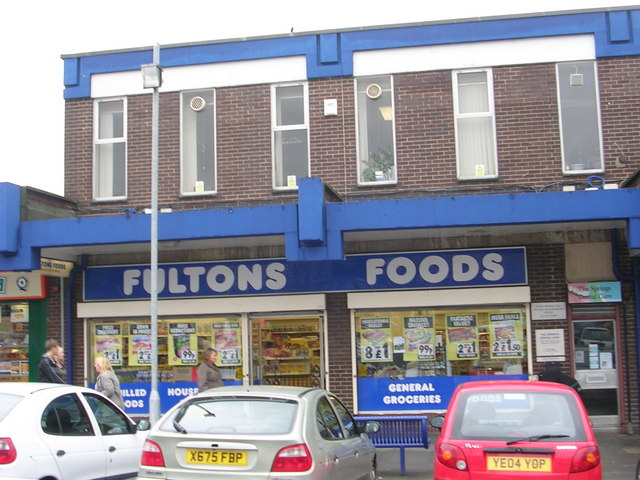
- A branch of Fultons Foods in Bramley, Leeds
- Trade name: Fulton's Foods
- Type: Subsidiary
- Industry: Retail
- Founded: 1960
- Defunct: 2022
- Headquarters: Barnsley, England
- Key people: Kevin Gunter, Managing Director; Karen Gunter, Finance Director
- Products: Frozen Foods; Household Products; Discount Groceries
- Revenue: £ 70 million (2014)
- Number of employees: 1,000
- Parent: Poundland
- Subsidiaries: Star Bargains
- Website: www.fultonsfoods.co.uk

Fulton's Foods was a frozen food retailer chain, which was based in Darton, South Yorkshire, and operated throughout The Midlands and the North of England. It traded online as Star Bargains.

== History ==
The company was founded by Jack Fulton in 1960 as a poultry business. It diversified into frozen foods in 1974, using the company name Frozen Value Ltd. In August 1997, it was then subject to a management buy-in, financed by 3i, when Kevin Gunter took control of the business.

In October 2005, it opened a 70,000 sq ft (6,500 m^{2}) depot in Darton, South Yorkshire. and in March 2013, the company was rebranded Fulton's Foods.

The founder, Jack Fulton, died on 29 September 2015.

In March 2018, Fulton's Foods announced they were trading online as "Star Bargains". The offering excluded chilled and frozen.

In October 2020, Poundland announced they had purchased Fulton's Foods.

In February 2022, the company announced the closure of all remaining stores.
