= G.I. Joe's =

American Sportswear store

- Type: Private
- Industry: Retail
- Founded: 1952; 74 years ago
- Defunct: 2009
- Fate: Chapter 11 Bankruptcy Liquidation
- Headquarters: Wilsonville, Oregon, U.S. 45°19′06″N 122°46′37″W
- Products: Sporting goods, clothing, auto parts
- Website: www.gijoes.com

G.I. Joe's was a privately held retail chain for sporting goods, ready-to-wear clothing, and auto parts; that operated stores in the Pacific Northwest region of the northwestern United States.

Founded in 1952, the company had as many as 31 stores, located in Oregon, Washington and Idaho. It was based in Wilsonville, Oregon. In 2007, the company changed its name to Joe's. In 2009, it filed for bankruptcy and was liquidated.

== 20th-century history ==
G.I. Joe's began in 1952, when Edward Orkney purchased army surplus sleeping bags and then set up a tent in Portland, Oregon, to sell them to the public. Orkney sold out of the sleeping bags and then started selling other army surplus merchandise in a store that then doubled in size by 1956, making it Portland's largest retailer of sporting goods and outdoor gear.

During the 1960s, Orkney transitioned the company away from military surplus and towards an eclectic combination of sporting goods, automotive parts, and hardware; the 1970s saw the company become a chain within the Portland metropolitan area, with its line of merchandise expanding to include housewares, lawn and garden supplies, and apparel. In 1976, Orkney died and his son, David Orkney, took over the business. A distribution center was built in 1979 in Wilsonville, with that facility expanded in 1986. G.I. Joe's opened its eighth store, located in Eugene, Oregon, in 1983. At the time, the company also operated 16 The Jean Machine stores, and the two chains had combined annual revenue of $68 million (~$186 million in 2024) in 1982.

In 1991, the chain expanded to the Seattle market and had increased to 14 stores with revenue of $135 million. The next year David Orkney stepped down as the chief executive officer and longtime-employee Norm Daniels assumed the role. The new Seattle store was about the same size as the Portland area stores, but re-focused on two product lines: automotive parts and sporting goods.

In 1998, the company made plans to go public by issuing an initial public offering (IPO) of stock to the general public. The plan was to use the cash from the sale of shares to fund an expansion program in order to become more of a regional chain. The company even filed with the U.S. Securities and Exchange Commission in late 1998 for an IPO, but the next year the plan was withdrawn when the expected unit price of the company's shares was not as high as had been hoped for by the company.

By 2000, revenue had increased to $161 million from 17 stores, making G.I. Joe's the 12th largest sporting goods retailer in the United States, and largest in the Pacific Northwest. It was also the 142nd largest retailer overall in the United States by revenue in 2000.

== G.I. Joe's changes to Joe's ==
Logo in the company's final two years of operation

On February 5, 2007, G.I. Joe's was sold to Gryphon Investors in a private equity deal that was later reported to be for about $50 million.

In March 2007, the newly acquired company announced that it was dropping the "G. I." from its name to become simply Joe's in order to better reflect its product line, which had not included military surplus in many years. The name change took effect on April 1, 2007. Also that year, the company opened its 28th store, and first in Idaho with a store in Meridian, and announced plans to build a new distribution center at its headquarters in Wilsonville. The company was a regular presenting sponsor of the annual C.A.R.T. race in Portland before the event ended after the 2007 race. In January 2008, Hal Smith replaced Norm Daniels as the company's CEO. The company hit a high of $274 million (~$391 million in 2024) in revenue for the sales year ending in 2008.

== Demise ==
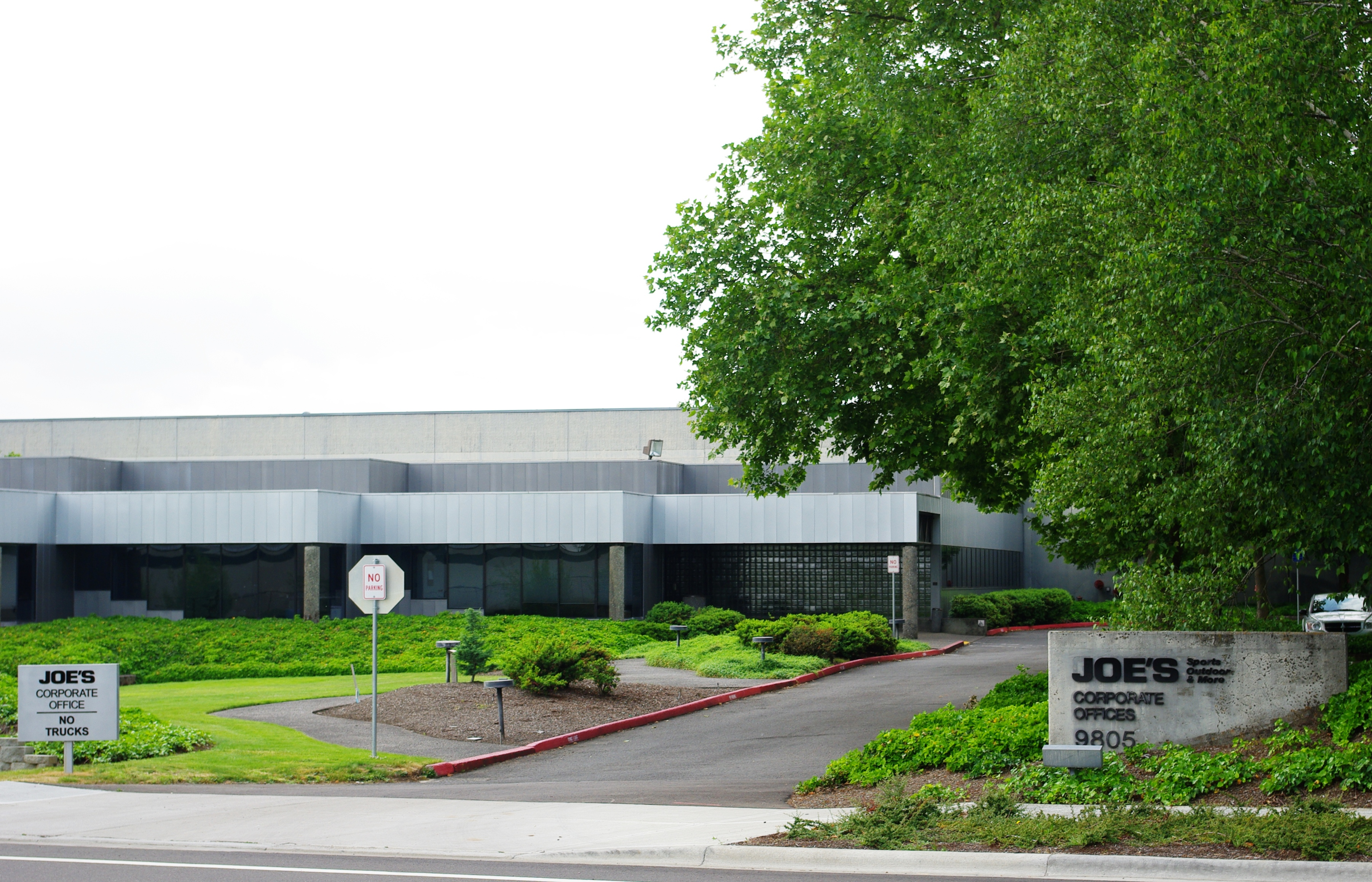
Company's headquarters in June 2009

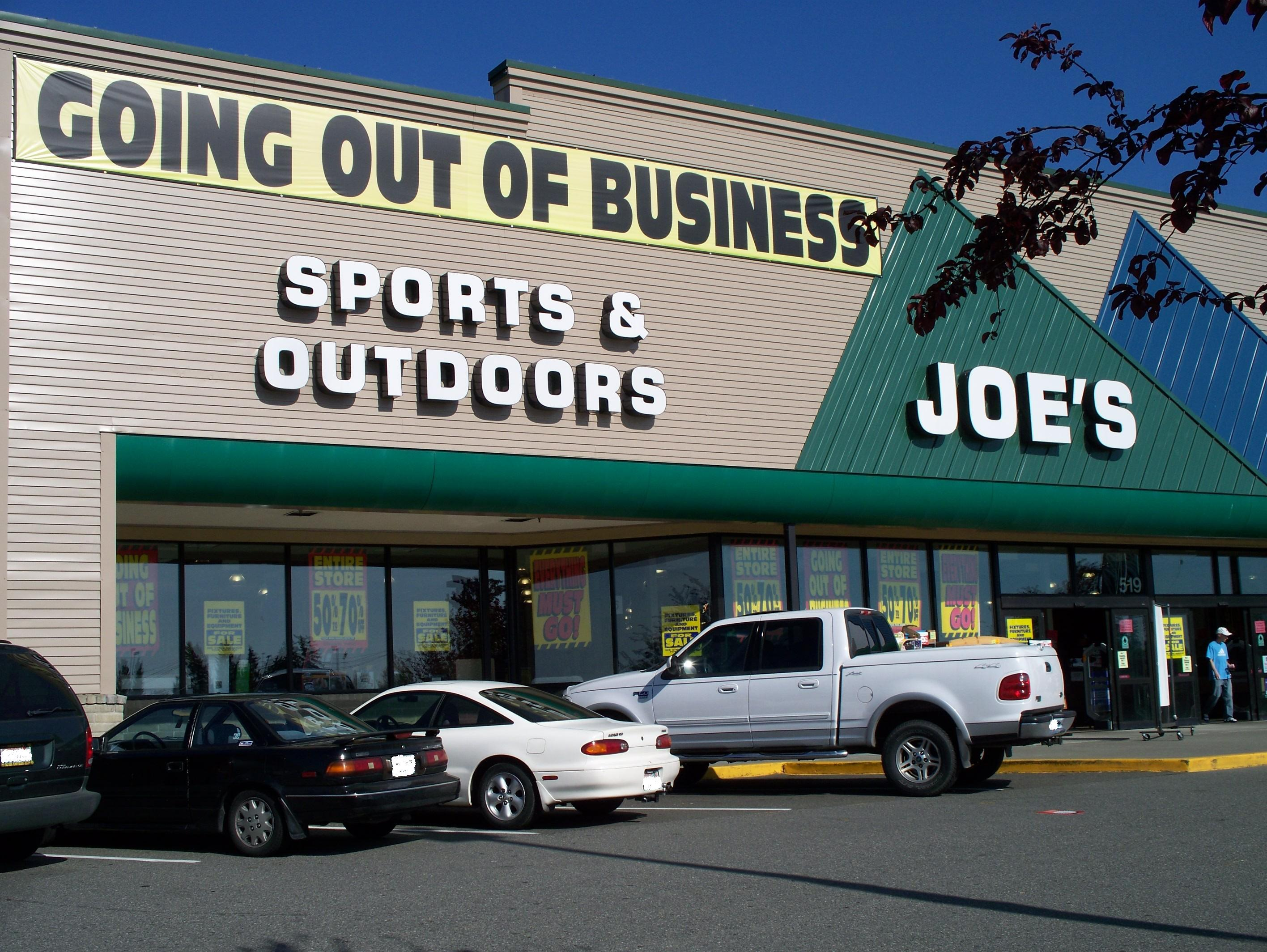
Lake Stevens, Washington, store in May 2009

December 2008 sales dropped off by 10%, partly due to winter snowstorms in the Northwest that paralyzed major cities as Christmas approached. Joe's then fell into violation of several loan covenants with its main lenders. Despite some efforts by the owners to infuse capital into the company, the lenders declined to restructure the loans and loan more money to Joe's.

On March 4, 2009, the chain filed for Chapter 11 bankruptcy reorganization with hopes of selling the company. Although the company had hoped "that some portion of the business could survive", "insufficient sources of capital" meant that the company had to accept a $61 million bid from a liquidator, Gordon Brothers. The company began liquidation sales on April 10, 2009, and all stores were closed by the end of May with 1600 employees laid off.

In June 2009, a general contractor for Dick's Sporting Goods announced it would begin renovating the former Joe's location in Hillsboro, Oregon, into what will be the second Dick's Sporting Goods in the state. Dick's later took over five other former Joe's locations in Oregon, and along with the Hillsboro site, all had been part of the plan by the former managers to resurrect a small part of the company. Another Joe's in Meridian, Idaho, was acquired by Dick's in January 2010 for a March opening.

=== Restart attempt ===
In January 2010, former Joe's executives established a small storefront in a strip mall in the Portland suburb of Bethany, in attempt to start a new version of the old company, but using the original G.I. Joe's moniker. Within six months, the attempt had failed after the former executives, a group that included the son of the G.I. Joe's founder Edward Orkney, were sued for trademark infringement by UFA Holdings, the company that had acquired the right to the name and related trademarks such as "Seize the Weekend". The former executives had thought they had legal standing since the UFA wasn't actively using the name.

== Online subsidiary ==
In addition to the retail stores, G.I. Joe's operated an online subsidiary called Joe's Direct. Joe's Direct was created in late 1998 when Timberline Direct, a catalog and electronic commerce firm based in Hillsboro, Oregon, was acquired by the company for $5.4 million.

The online presence was operated by GSI Commerce, and was sold to Canada-based UFA Co-operative Limited. As of June 2010, UFA uses the domains it acquired to redirect traffic to a website for its U.S. sporting goods business, Wholesale Sports.

== History book ==
Growing Up With G.I. Joe's was published in November 2015 by Columbia Press. It was written by Janna Orkney, the store founder Ed Orkney's daughter, and tells the story of G.I. Joe's founding and growth.
