= Gordon Brothers =

American retail investment group

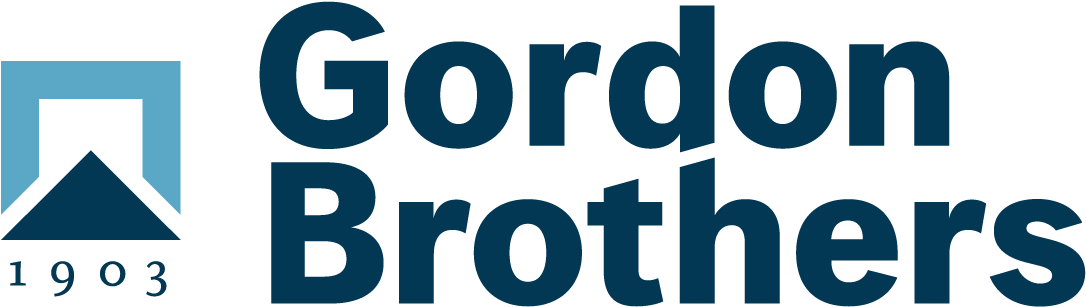
- Type: Private
- Industry: Investments
- Founded: 1903; 123 years ago
- Founder: J. B. Gordon
- Headquarters: Prudential Tower; Boston, Massachusetts
- Area served: International
- Key people: Norma Kuntz (CEO) Michael Frieze (chairman emeritus and former CEO) Ken Frieze (chairman and former CEO)
- Products: Investments
- Services: Valuations, dispositions, operations, and investments
- Website: gordonbrothers.com

Gordon Brothers Group is an American retail focused investment firm that was founded in 1903 by Jacob Gordon. The firm has made headlines with its acquisition of Polaroid from bankruptcy in 2009 and its subsequent sale to Polish businessman Wiaczesław Smołokowski in 2017. Its headquarters are in Boston, Massachusetts, United States.

In December 2022, Gordon Brothers announced that Norma Kuntz would be appointed CEO of the company, effective February 13, 2023.

In May 2023, Gordon Brothers acquired H2 Brands Groups, a national consumer products company with annual sales in excess of $250 million and a portfolio of nationally recognized brands.

In June 2025, Gordon Brothers acquired struggling discount chain Poundland from Pepco Group for a nominal one pound sterling.

In December 2025, Gordon Brothers purchased Barbeques Galore Two months later it was placed in receivership.

== Notable liquidations ==
- Bed Bath & Beyond
- CompUSA
- G.I. Joe's
- KB Toys
- Linens 'n Things
- Music World
- The Sharper Image
- Anchor Blue Clothing Company (60 locations)
- Hollywood Video/Movie Gallery/GameCrazy
- Borders
- Syms
- Lechter’s Housewares
- American Retail Group (hired Gordon Brothers to manage closing sales across every Uptons stores in 1999)
- Bradlees
- Ames
- Kmart (hired in 2002 along with other firms to handle closures across the US, previously handled closures in 2000)
- Shopko (previously handled closures in 2001, and few occasional closures between 2001 and 2019, including the Pamida merger, Gordon Brothers would handle liquidation sales at all Shopko stores in 2019)
- Toys R Us (hired in 2006 to close 75 stores, occasionally stepped in for some store closures from 2007 to 2017, Gordon Brothers was hired again in 2018 when Toys R Us winded down operations across the US)
- Caldor
- Finlay Enterprises
- Eaton’s
- Jacobson’s
- Big Lots
- Harold’s Stores Inc
- The Bombay Company
- Montgomery Ward (was hired to close underperforming stores from 1997 to 1999, and was hired again to liquidate the remaining Montgomery Ward stores in 2001)
- JCPenney (select stores throughout the 2000s, and then in the 2020s when it was appointed to close 154 stores when they filed for bankruptcy)
- Discovery Communications (hired to handle closures of every Discovery Channel Store in 2007)
- Hasbro (hired to handle closures of every Wizards of the Coast/The Game Keeper stores in 2003)
- Scotts Miracle Gro (hired to handle closures of every Smith & Hawken stores in 2009
- Dunlap’s (hired to close Heironimus stores in 2004, some select closures in 2005, and worked with Dunlap’s again to close its remaining stores in 2007)
- S&K Menswear (handled going out of business liquidation sales across all of S&K’s stores in 2009)
- Office Depot (handled select stores throughout 2001 to 2023)
- Federated Department Stores/Macy’s Inc (handled select store closures throughout 1998 until 2017, like the wind down of remaining Stern’s locations in 2001, the liquidation of the Lazarus flagship in Columbus, OH in 2004, the closures of duplicate Macy’s/May stores in 2006 after the May acquisition and more)
- Boscov’s (hired in 2008 along with Hilco to close 10 underperforming stores as a result of Boscov’s bankruptcy in August)
- Spiegel (handled liquidation sales of Spiegel’s outlet stores in 2003)
- Home Depot (handled liquidation sales of all EXPO Design Center stores in 2009)
- Decathlon Sports (handled liquidation sales of select stores in 2003)
- HELLWEG Die Profi-Bau- & Gartenmärkte GmbH & Co. KG (2026)

== Notable restructurings ==
- Laura Ashley plc
- L.K.Bennett
- Polaroid brand, acquired in 2009 with Hilco and sold 2017
- Poundland
  - Dealz (brand in Ireland and Isle of Man only, main business owned by Modella Capital)
  - Pep&Co
- Telefunken
