= Rosanna Johnson =

Irish street trader

Rosanna "Rosie" Johnson
- Born: Rosanna Walsh; 24 March 1891; Dublin, Ireland
- Died: 12 November 1987 (aged 96); Connolly Hospital, Dublin
- Occupation: street trader
- Known for: status as "the queen of Moore Street"

Rosanna "Rosie" Johnson (24 March 1891 - 12 November 1987) was an Irish street trader, best known as "the queen of Moore Street".

== Life ==
Rosanna Johnson was born Rosanna Walsh in Dublin on 24 March 1891. She was the youngest of six daughters of stone cutter, James Walsh, and Mary Walsh (née Martin) who lived in Sampson's Lane, off Moore Street. She started selling bunches of violets for a penny at age 12, and held her own stall on Moore Street by age 17. From 1908 to 1978, Johnson sold vegetables, fruit and flowers from her stall. Her stall was located in pitch number one, on the corner of Henry Street and Moore Street. Her outgoing and friendly nature made her popular with customers and other traders. She was known for wearing a traditional Irish shawl and a green ribbon in her hair. Amongst her friends were Maureen Potter and Jimmy Durante, and the song "Rosie up in Moore St." was about her. It is reputed that Jimmy O'Dea spoke to her for inspiration. Johnson claimed to drink more than 20 bottles of stout a day, which added to her legend as part of Dublin of a bygone era.

Shortly after she was born, she moved to 12 Moore Street, and lived there until her retirement in 1978. When she left the house, it was condemned and demolished. She passed her pitch to her daughter-in-law, and she moved in with her son at Edenmore Grove, Raheny. Even in her retirement, Johnson got the first bus to Moore Street every day, sitting at her old stall chatting with traders, tourists, and other passers-by. Johnson had two sons and one daughter. No details are known about her husband. She died in Connolly Hospital on 12 November 1987. On its way to St Mary's Pro-Cathedral her funeral cortège passed her old trading pitch.
