= Euroland (store) =

Dutch variety store chain

- Formerly: 2.50 Shop (1997-2001); Knaakland (2001)
- Industry: Retail
- Founded: 1997; 28 years ago
- Number of locations: 34
- Area served: Netherlands
- Website: euroland.nu

Euroland was a Dutch variety store chain.

== History ==
In 1997, the first 2.50 Shop opened its doors, selling everything for ƒ2.50. In 2001, the similar shop called Knaakland ("knaak" was a ƒ2.50 coin) was bought by the 2.50 Shop chain. Both shops kept their original name until the introduction of the euro, less than a year later. Both shops were rebranded to Euroland, using a logo similar to that of Knaakland, and initially selling everything for a euro.

As the assortment expanded, the initial €1-only policy was dropped, and other, more expensive goods appeared. Later on however, everything displayed on the side walls was on sale for €1 with more expensive goods occupying the middle of the store. This partitioning was intended to avoid confusion.

The chain went bankrupt in 2017.

== See also ==
- Action
- Zeeman (chain store)
- Poundland
- Family Dollar
