= Mr Price (Ireland) =

Irish discount retail chain

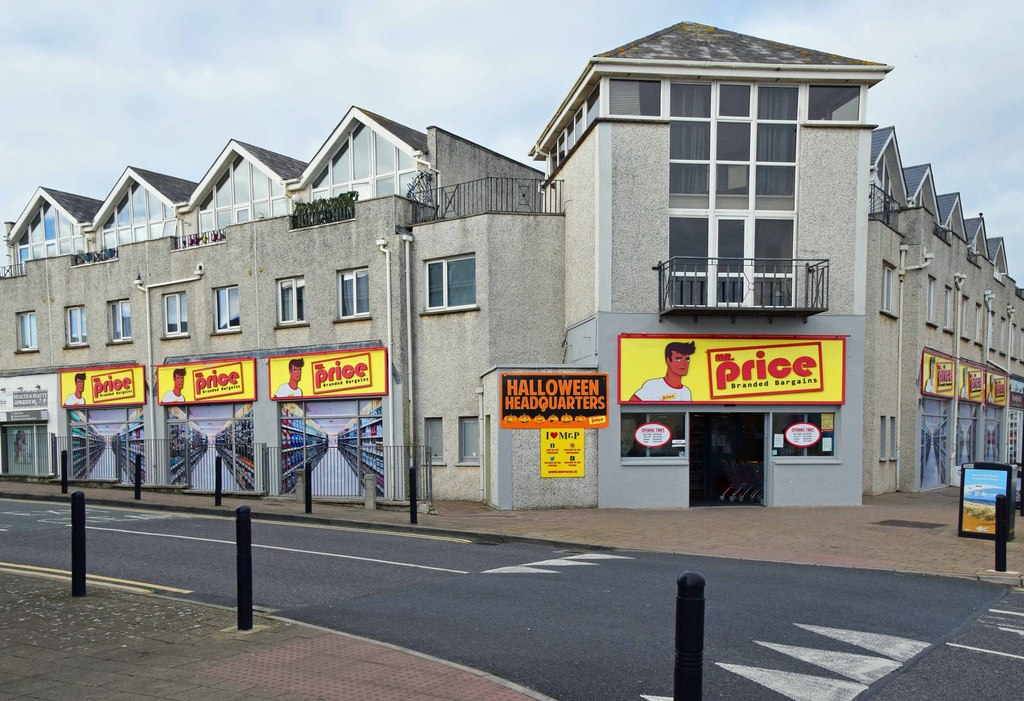
- Mr Price, Bettystown, Co. Meath
- Industry: Retail
- Founded: 2010; 16 years ago
- Headquarters: Tallaght, Dublin
- Number of locations: 70+
- Area served: Ireland
- Key people: Edel McSorley (operations manager)
- Products: Consumer goods
- Owner: Corajio Unlimited Company
- Number of employees: Approx. 1,800
- Website: www.mrprice.online

Mr Price is an Irish chain of discount stores, founded in 2010. It operates nationwide and sells a variety of consumer goods, including stationery, toys, cleaning goods, tools and confectionary. Its main competitors are Dealz and Normal.

In 2025, people with disabilities accounted for approximately 18% of Mr Price's workforce. The company has worked with disability organisations and government employment programmes to recruit and support disabled employees.

In 2018, Mr Price purchased a new 15,000 square-metre distribution facility on a six-hectare site in Athlone, and announced an intention to expand its number of shops from 42 to 60 and to create 200 jobs over the following three years. The new facility was intended to automate and centralise its distribution operations, with the consolidation of its existing warehouses in Dublin, Mayo and Tipperary.

In the 2020s, Mr Price was involved in a dispute with supermarket chain Dunnes Stores regarding the sale of groceries at its shop in Barrow Valley Retail Park in Carlow. In July 2022, the High Court held that Mr Price was prohibited from selling certain grocery items from that unit on the basis of a restrictive covenant in the lease for the unit, which prohibited the tenant from operating a supermarket. Mr Price appealed the decision, and in February 2024, the Court of Appeal again held in favour of Dunnes Stores.

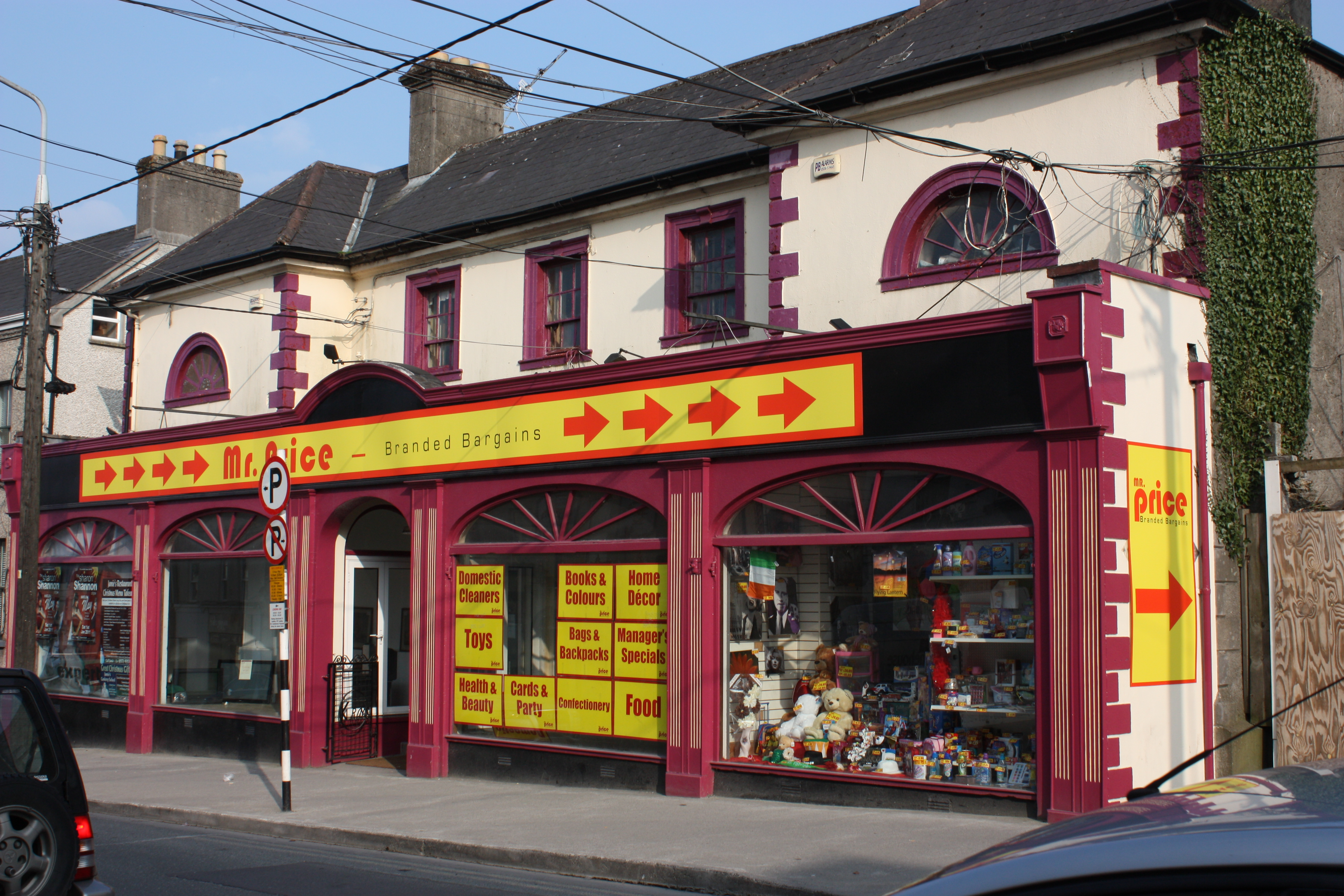
Mr Price, Tullamore, Co. Offaly

Mr Price caused controversy in early 2025 with a marketing campaign whereby its vans displayed the slogans, Fancy a Ride, Like my rear?, Honk for a Hunk, and From Hunk to Hero, together with a cartoon mascot, portrayed as a muscular topless man. Complaints were made about the sexualised inuendo contained in the slogans and imagery. On April Fools' Day 2025, Mr Price reacted to the controversy by announcing that its mascot would thereafter be portrayed entirely nude.
