= Poundland =

British variety store and fashion retailer

Poundland Limited
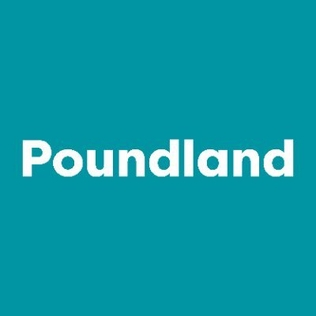
- Logo used since 2024.
- Formerly: Pound Land Limited (1990–1993); Poundland PLC (1993–1998); The Ise Group PLC (1998–2001); Poundland PLC (2001–2002)
- Type: Private
- Industry: Retail; Fashion
- Predecessor: 99p Stores; Fultons Foods; Star Bargains
- Founded: 25 April 1990; 36 years ago
- Founders: Dave Dodd; Steven Smith
- Headquarters: Walsall, England, UK
- Number of locations: 825 (2025)
- Key people: Barry Williams (CEO)
- Products: Groceries, consumer goods, DIY, electrical
- Brands: Pep&Co
- Revenue: £1.31 billion (2016)
- Operating income: £56.9 million (2016)
- Net income: £12.0 million (2016)
- Number of employees: 12,000 (2026)
- Parent: 1903 Peach Bidco Limited
- Subsidiaries: Dealz (Ireland and Isle of Man)
- Website: poundland.co.uk

Poundland Limited is a British variety store and fashion retailer headquartered in Walsall, England. It was founded by Dave Dodd and Steven Smith in 1990, originally selling all of its items at the single price of £1. It is currently owned by 1903 Peach Bidco Limited, a consortium which includes Gordon Brothers and Pepco Group.

Poundland grew from a single location in Burton upon Trent, opening its hundredth location in 2003. In 2011, it expanded internationally by launching its first locations in Ireland under the name Dealz, and later into Poland and the Isle of Man (Poundland owns Dealz in Ireland and the Isle of Man; the Polish business is owned by Modella Capital). In 2015, Poundland acquired rival 99p Stores. In 2016, Steinhoff International acquired Poundland for £610 million. The following year, Poundland began offering a small selection of items in its stores exceeding £1.

In January 2025, in light of a sales slump, it was reported that it would increase its £1-and-under product range. On 12 June 2025, three months after Teneo was selected to find a buyer for Poundland due to its underperformance, Gordon Brothers bought the British firm for a nominal one pound sterling. The owners then repeatedly talked about putting the financially troubled company into administration, most recently in November 2026.

== History ==
=== 1990s: Formation and early history ===
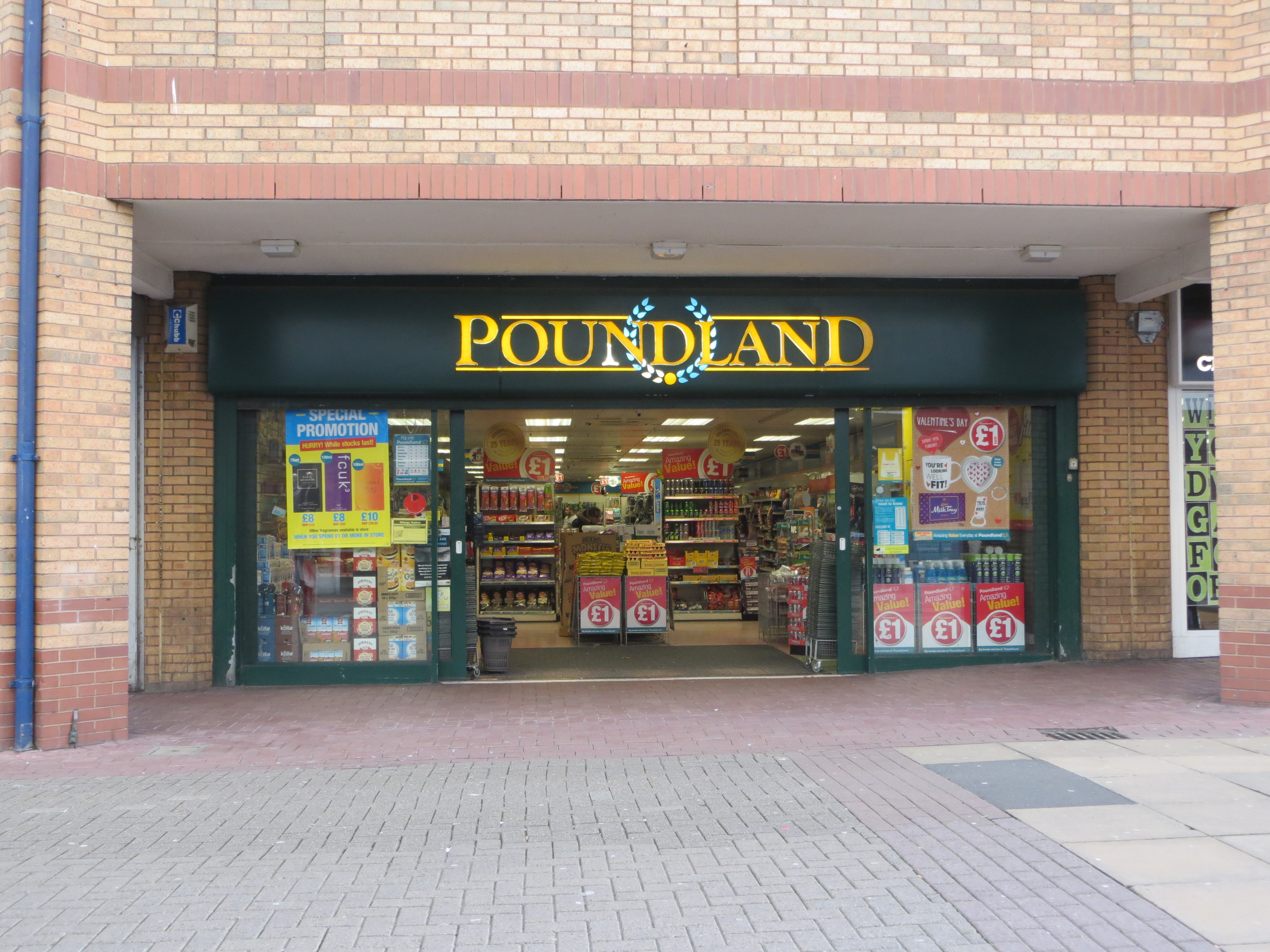
Poundland store with the old (pre-2006) branding, Birkenhead, Merseyside in 2016

Pound Land Limited was co-founded by Dave Dodd and father and son team Keith and Steven Smith on 25 April 1990 with a starting capital of just £50,000 and an office in Sedgley. The firm was funded by a loan from Keith Smith, who had set up the wholesaler and discount store Hooty's in 1963. The first pilot shop opened in December 1990 in Burton upon Trent and managed a turnover of £13,000 on its first day of trading. Previous attempts at opening pilot shops had failed after being turned down by landlords who had reservations about allowing such a shop to operate and doubted the single-price concept would be successful in the UK.

By the end of the first year, Poundland was operating from several shops and had turned over £1 million, with a profit of £6,000. Growth continued throughout the early 1990s, with six shops by December 1991 and a further seven a year later. In 1995, Steven Smith failed to plan for more warehouse space and retail growth pushed their storage capacity past its limits. In response to unacceptably high stock theft, a new 130,000-square-foot (12,000 m^{2}) warehouse was built, although it reduced profits from £850,000 in 1994 to £400,000 in 1995. Operational difficulties were resolved throughout 1996, when a new office in Hong Kong opened to support product sourcing and operations in the UK.

=== Early to mid-2000s: Expansion and management buyout ===
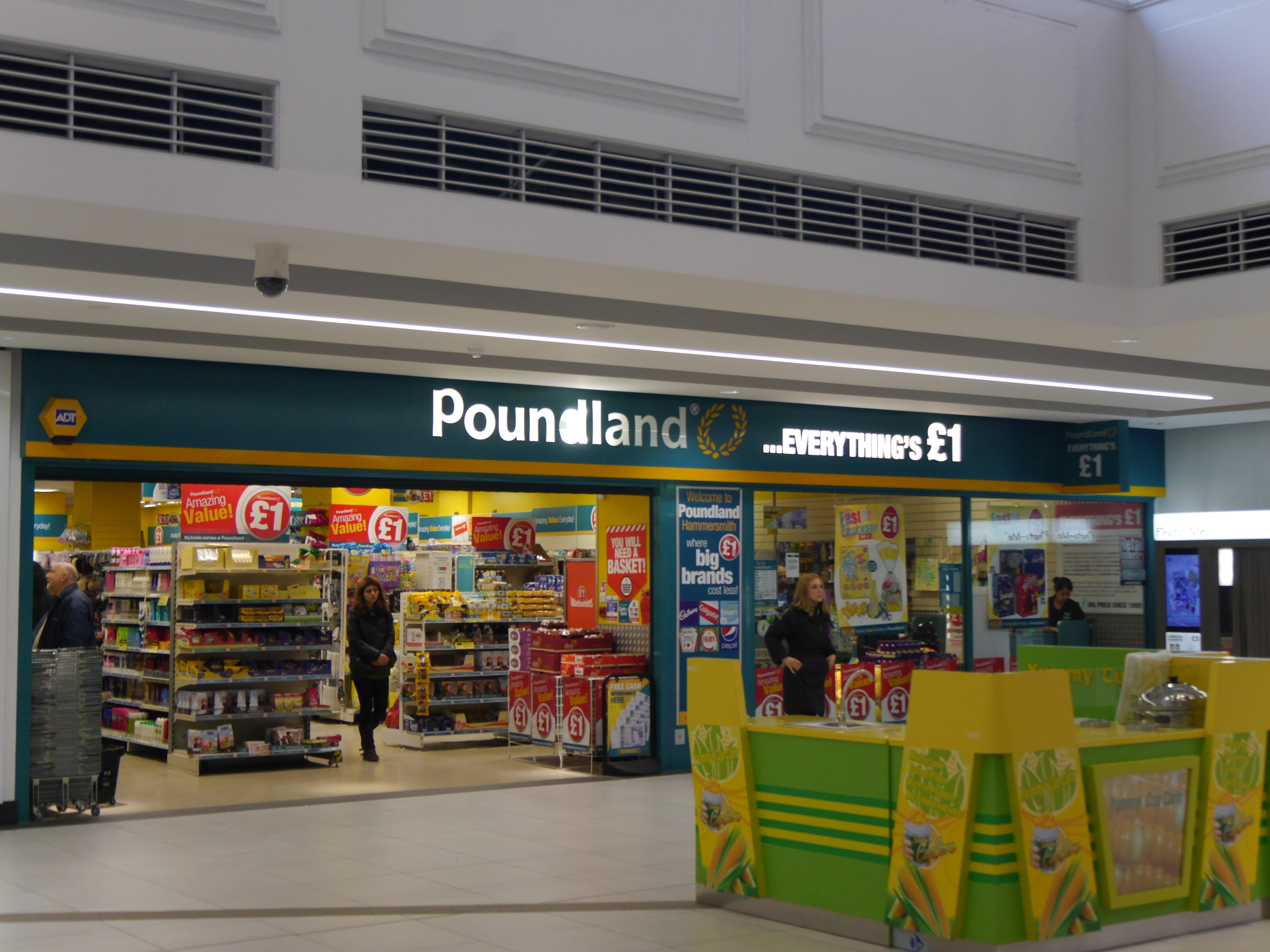
Poundland, Kings Mall, Hammersmith, London

Although enduring a troubled first few years, by the 2000s Poundland had become a multi-million-pound business, opening their 150th shop in Northampton in mid-2006 with steady increases in gross turnover throughout the decade. Following a management buy-out in 2002 by Advent International for £50 million, the company continued to grow with annual profit growth of 46% a year from £4.1 million in 2006 to £12.7 million in 2009. Chairman Colin Smith, speaking in April 2005 as Poundland revealed it had invested £20–25 million in building a 300,000 square feet (28,000 m^{2}) distribution centre, suggested there was great scope for further growth, saying "We can clearly conceive this chain having 400-plus stores in future"; this target was reached in 2012 with the opening of their Haringey store.

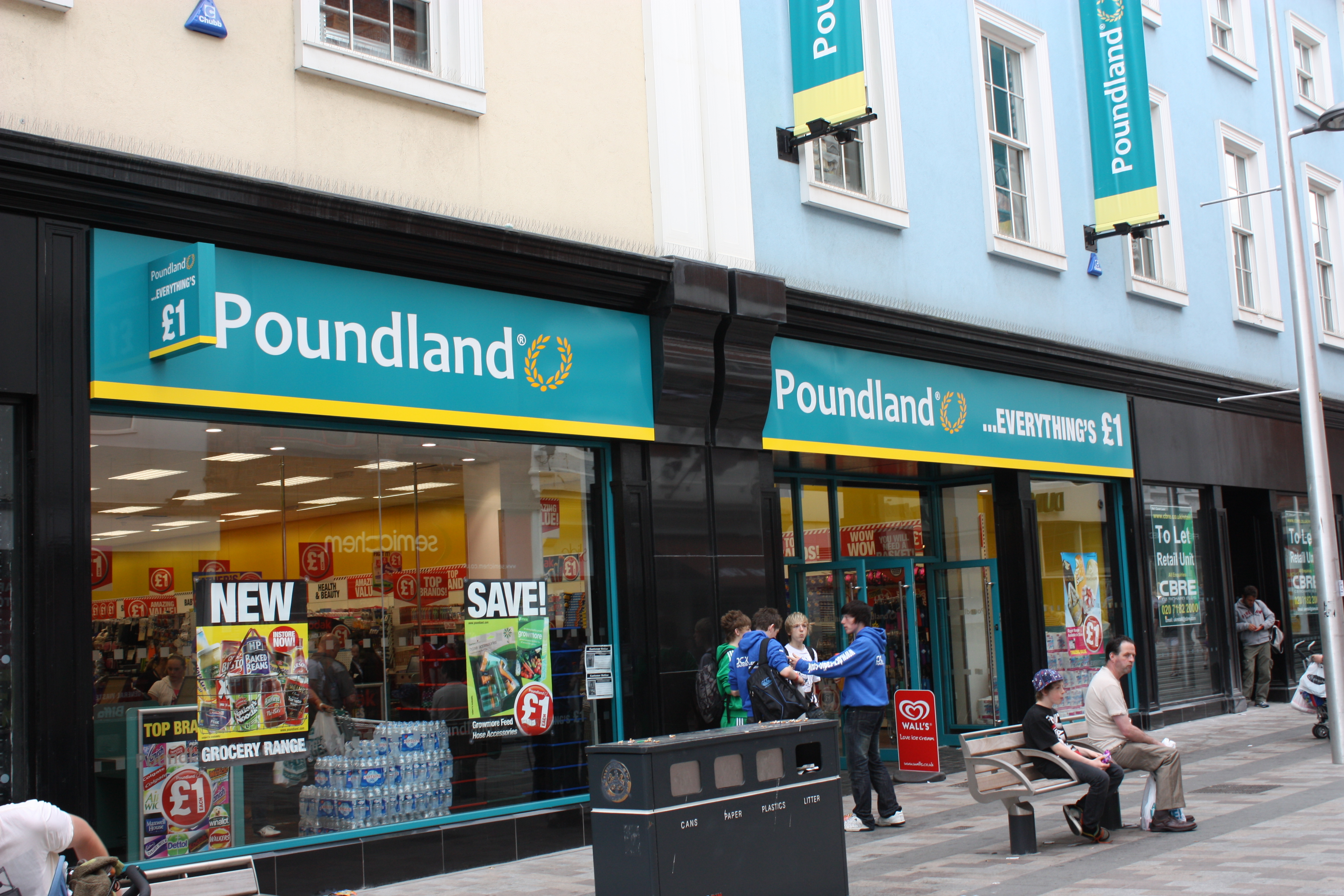
A Poundland store in Belfast

=== Late-2000s: Economic recession ===
Poundland reported strong sales during the 2008 financial crisis, with 2008–2009 revenue just short of £400 million, up from £330 million the previous year. Despite this, Poundland closed stores not financially viable, even if well-positioned, such as in West Ealing where it was believed that high rental costs were one of the reasons why the company pulled out of the area. Former CEO Jim McCarthy suggested there is a misconception that Poundland is a better business in a recession, saying that they are better during normal economic conditions, but robust enough to manage well under any economic conditions.

When the rate of VAT was reduced in November 2008 from 17.5% to 15%, Poundland's prices remained fixed at £1, having kept the single price of £1 for 18 years while absorbing duty and increased supplier costs, saying that savings would be passed on in other ways. Reports emerged in September 2008 that Poundland's owners, Advent International, were to put the retail chain up for sale, with figures showing that value retailers were seeing business boom during the economic recession, noting that value-conscious customers were switching from traditional larger supermarket retailers for everyday necessities. The retailer announced in 2010 a surge in sales by nearly 35% over the 2009–2010 festive period.

=== 2010s ===
In early 2010, Poundland's owners Advent International were planning on cashing in on the resurgence in discount retailers by preparing to put the chain up for sale. The report came as figures showed that value retailers were seeing a business boom in the 2008 financial crisis, with Barclays Private Equity expressing an interest in a potential take-over of Poundland for about £200 million. On 4 May 2010, it was announced that Poundland had been sold to US private equity firm Warburg Pincus for £200 million and was the subject of an initial public offering in March 2014.

The company acquired 99p Stores in 2015, which was followed by a drop in its share price from 350p to 150p. In May 2016, it launched a new brand of shops to replace the 99p Stores brand called Poundland & More, selling at a range of different prices. In August 2016, the now-struggling Poundland was sold to the South African company Steinhoff International for £610 million. Poundland's shareholders approved the takeover in September 2016, taking it private again after more than 2 years.

In November 2017, Poundland signed a deal with British online shopping retailer musicMagpie to receive supplies of used CDs, DVDs and Blu-Rays, which are then sold for £1 as part of Poundland's Replay range. In July 2019, it was reported that Poundland expected to sell 24 million physical media copies over four years by the end of 2019.

=== 2020s ===
In October 2020, Poundland announced they had purchased Frozen Value Ltd, a frozen food retailer known for the Fulton's Foods chain of convenience stores. In 2021, Poundland introduced a new 'corner shop' convenience store format called Poundland Local, with the first two shops being acquired from Fulton's Foods and converted into the new format. Poundland Local was first launched in the East Midlands and Yorkshire, with the stores selling a core range of everyday groceries, snacks and household products. The first Poundland Local opened in Kendray (near Barnsley) on 21 May 2021, with a second store opening the next day in Hornsea. In addition to Poundland Local, the firm also trialled a new store concept for railway stations and other transport hubs called Poundland Go!

In February 2022, Poundland opened their biggest retail store at Riverside Retail Park, Nottingham, in a former multi-outlet clothing store previously housing Dorothy Perkins, Topman, Topshop, Burton and Miss Selfridge, which closed following the collapse of parent Arcadia Group in 2020. The new Poundland outlet sells a wider range of foodstuffs including beer, wine and spirits, fresh fruit and vegetables in addition to chilled and frozen food. This wider range is planned to be rolled out to further stores during 2022. Soon after, Poundland announced that a bigger new store opening was imminent, located at Stockton on Tees. In September 2023, Poundland acquired 71 stores from the collapsed Wilko chain in a last-minute deal and said it would prioritise the recruitment of former Wilko staff.

In March 2025, Pepco Group appointed advisors at Teneo to handle a sale of the once-again struggling company for a nominal one pound sterling. It was understood that Gordon Brothers, Hilco Capital, Modella Capital, Alteri Investors and Endless were interested in the retailer. Dealz's Polish business would not be included in the sale. In June 2025, Gordon Brothers acquired Poundland, later announcing that Poundland would go back to its pre-Pepco Group formula, discontinuing its Poundland Perks scheme, its home delivery service and its frozen food offer. It also said it would change its clothing offer and that many stores and two distribution centres would close. Dealz's Irish stores, also part of the sale, were unaffected. On 5 August, it was understood that Poundland could go into administration if their restructure plan does not get the greenlight. On 26 August, Poundland avoided going into administration as their restructure plan was approved.

In August 2026, it was reported that Gordon Brothers were in talks with their advisers over launching a potential auction for the company with Modella Capital and Hilco Capital bidding once again, Fortress Investment Group, Henderson Property Group, CDS Superstores and Poundland's own management (via Northern Ireland's Martin Property Group) are also interested. If not sold to the company's management, Poundland will collapse into administration and will be sold off in pieces, with the brand, IP and some stores being sold to the bidder, and Lidl and multiple Irish investors interested in some of the company's assets such as some of its stores and Dealz's Irish business respectively. In September 2026, due to the potential auction, Poundland's credit insurers stopped providing cover to new suppliers guaranteeing payment for orders, causing Poundland management to visit Shanghai to reassure Chinese factory owners.

On 29 October 2026, after more than a year under Gordon Brothers' ownership, Poundland filed a notice of intention to appoint administrators, putting 12,000 jobs at risk. The owners rejected two offers to buy the business from Ireland's Martin Property Group, and also received an offer from the London-based Xyra Group. Martin Property Group urged Gordon Brothers to release funding that would enable shelf restocking and payment of suppliers so that the retailer remained a going concern; ahead of an initial 12 November administration deadline, Poundland was reportedly unable to buy new stock to fill its shelves after £50m in its bank accounts was frozen by Gordon Brothers. On 11 November, the BBC reported the administration process could be delayed to allow more time for a rescue deal after the owners released £10m in funding. Gordon Brothers executives and Poundland management gave evidence to the House of Commons business select committee and on 12 November Poundland obtained a two-week extension of High Court legal protection from creditors. The firm subsequently launched an emergency resupply effort, codenamed "Operation Gloria", distributing about 16m grocery items to 600 shops in the UK and Ireland. Two further bids - from Germany's Zachert Private Equity and a Dubai-based bidder - were subsequently reported.

== Business operations ==
=== Sales strategy ===
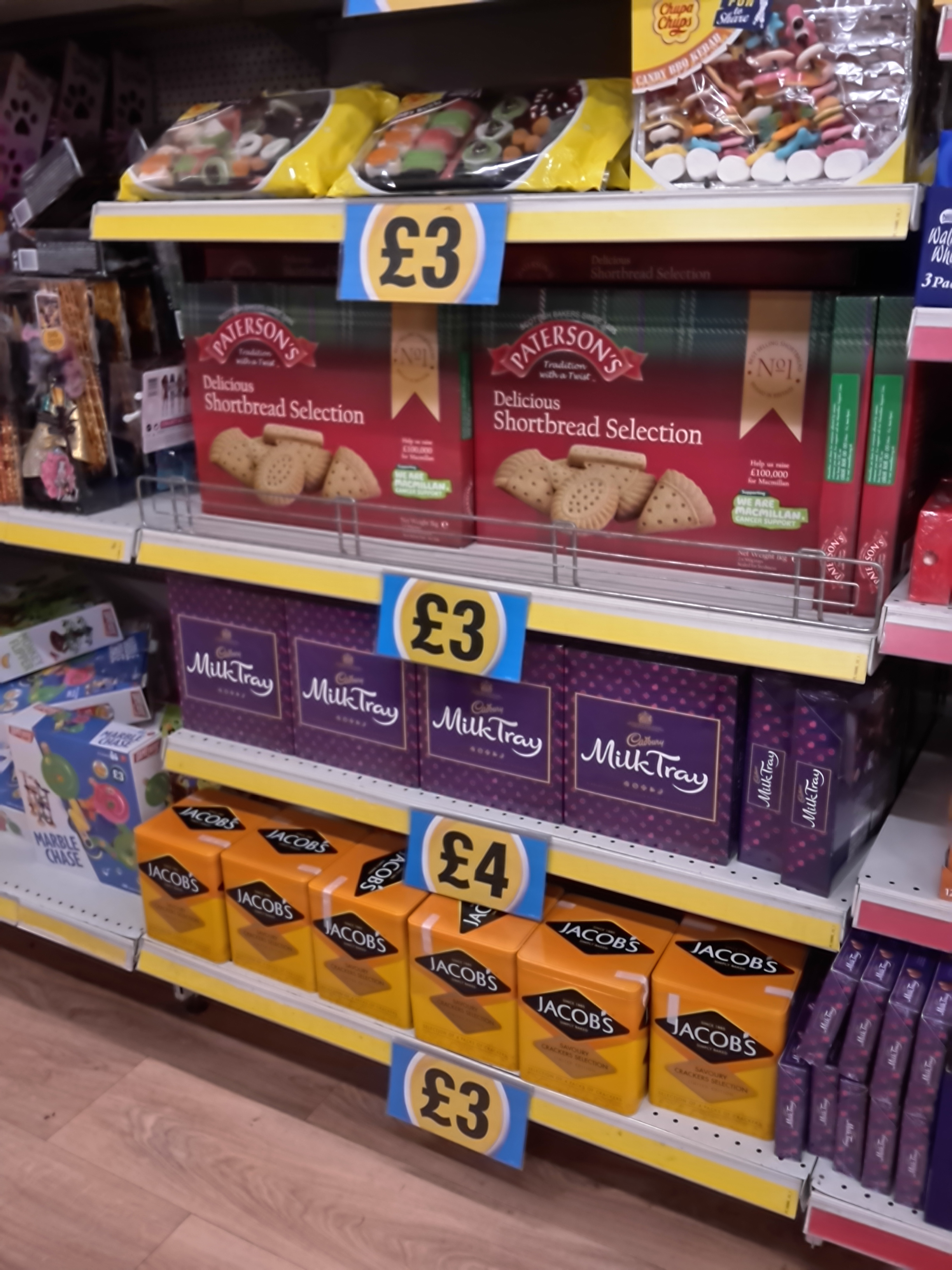
Items on sale at Poundland that cost more than £1

For much of its history, Poundland promoted their sales strategy through the slogan: "Yes, Everything's £1!", however in 2015, after it started running promotions for items costing more than £1, the Advertising Standards Authority (ASA) upheld complaints that the slogan was misleading and required Poundland to retire it, though Poundland argued that the products were only available with other purchases. There had been plans to expand the price offering in 2009 (such as a £2 section, 50p section etc.), but they were decided against at the time after understanding the overwhelming message from customers was not to change the easily understandable single price strategy, though Poundland eventually moved away from the strategy and began selling products for over £1 in 2017; as of June 2021, it was reported that one in ten products in its stores had exceeded £1.

For the majority of stock sold at £1, the company does not need to transmit pricing information to stores and associate price tags with each item. With some manufacturers being apprehensive about selling their brands in a discount environment, the store offers the alternative of selling the products under their own brand. Inflation can present challenges to single-price retailers as the primary marketing strategy requires products never to increase in price. However, inflation can also be to an advantage, as some products which may previously have retailed below £1 (therefore cheaper elsewhere) may then become better value for £1.

Problems arising from inflation are dismissed by Poundland, such as freight costs which become lower when the pound is weaker, in turn counteracting the impact. Various sales tactics are adopted to counteract inflation and reduce costs, including decreasing the quantity of an item within a set (such as removing a pencil within a larger pack) and replacing known brands with their own-brand alternatives. Examples of branded products being replaced include confectionery products After Eights and Toblerone. Poundland's Toblerone replacement planned to launch in July 2017, by offering a closely resembling own-brand product named Twin Peaks, though following a legal battle from Toblerone's manufacturer, the product had to be redesigned to be distinctly different.

=== Products offered ===
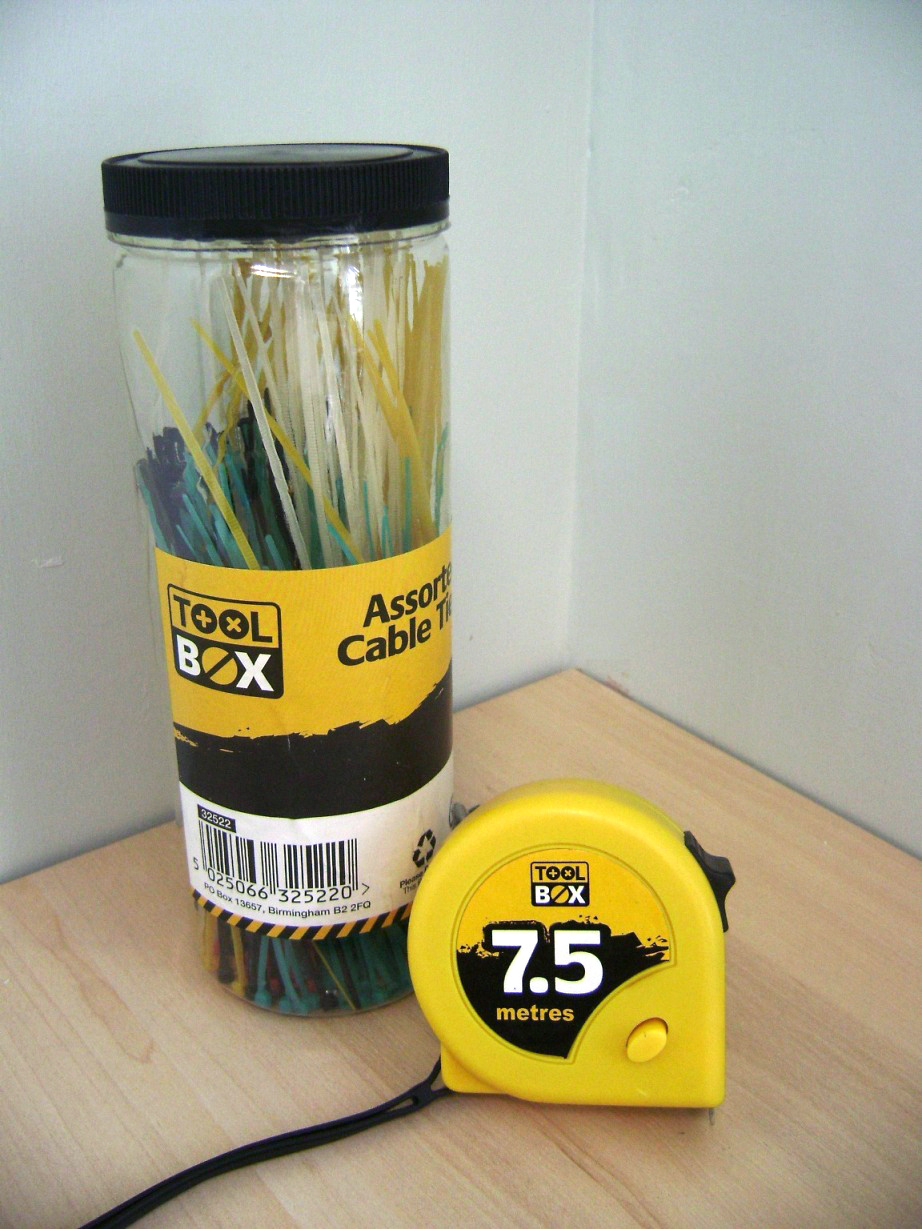
Former in-house brand "Toolbox".

Poundland offer approximately 3,500 products, of which 1,000 are branded, mostly food and drink. Stock typically is categorised as either ongoing core lines (products bought direct from the manufacturer), seasonal ranges or clearance stock, with 10,000 new products featured each year. Initially, unbranded products stocked by Poundland (accounting for roughly 70% of total stock) would carry the Poundland branding and logo, however the retailer determined it could increase sales by removing the Poundland branding and instead marketing their own sub-brand of products. Some of the products sold under the in-house brand are supplied by manufacturers who are worried about their brand being sold in discount stores and would rather allow their products to sell without their own branding attached.

As well as their in-house brand lines, the retailer sells many products from familiar brands, such as Colgate, Walkers and Cadbury. Poundland were reported to be Britain's largest seller of batteries in 2009, stocking brands such as Sony, Panasonic and Kodak in competitively priced quantities, with Kodak AA batteries being a high seller 2009. Poundland also sell large quantities of their stock to other retailers off-the-shelf, where it is cheaper for these retailers to pay £1 each for a bulk purchase than it would be to pay a discounted bulk-purchase rate elsewhere.

From 2016, Pep&Co clothing items were sold in Poundland branches, although at prices higher than the £1 single-price. Whilst some Pep&Co outlets would share store space with larger Poundland outlets, smaller stores feature a minimal clothing offering.

In 2018, Poundland announced that it will stop selling kitchen knives in all stores across the UK following a surge in knife attacks. As of July 2018, the ban has taken effect in the London and West Midlands regions.

From 2023, Poundland and Pep&Co product ranges were gradually phased out in favour of Pepco branded ranges. This transition was seen as a potential cause for a dip in like-for-like sales at the group in 2024.

=== Customers ===
Poundland estimated it served 7 million customers per week in 2016, with most in the C1, C2, D and E categories although claimed in 2008 that 10% of their customers were in the A/B social grade groups, an increase of 22% compared to 2007. Poundland was seeking in 2008 to expand into mainstream shopping centres and districts, with a focus on attracting higher-earning consumers rather than their earlier appeal to low-income households.

== Corporate affairs ==
=== Competition ===
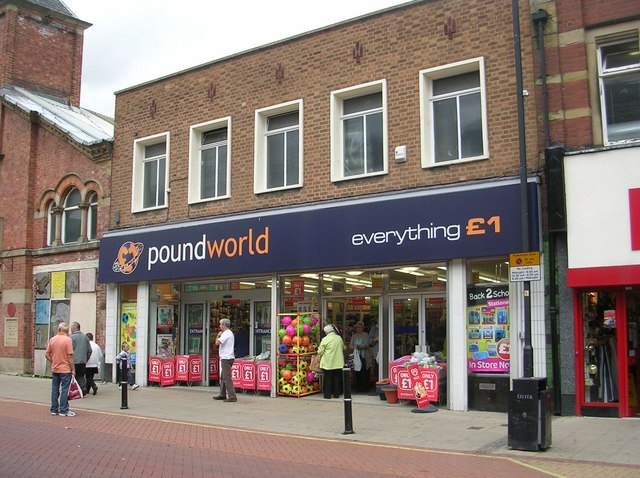
A Poundworld store in Castleford, which was Poundland's closest competitor

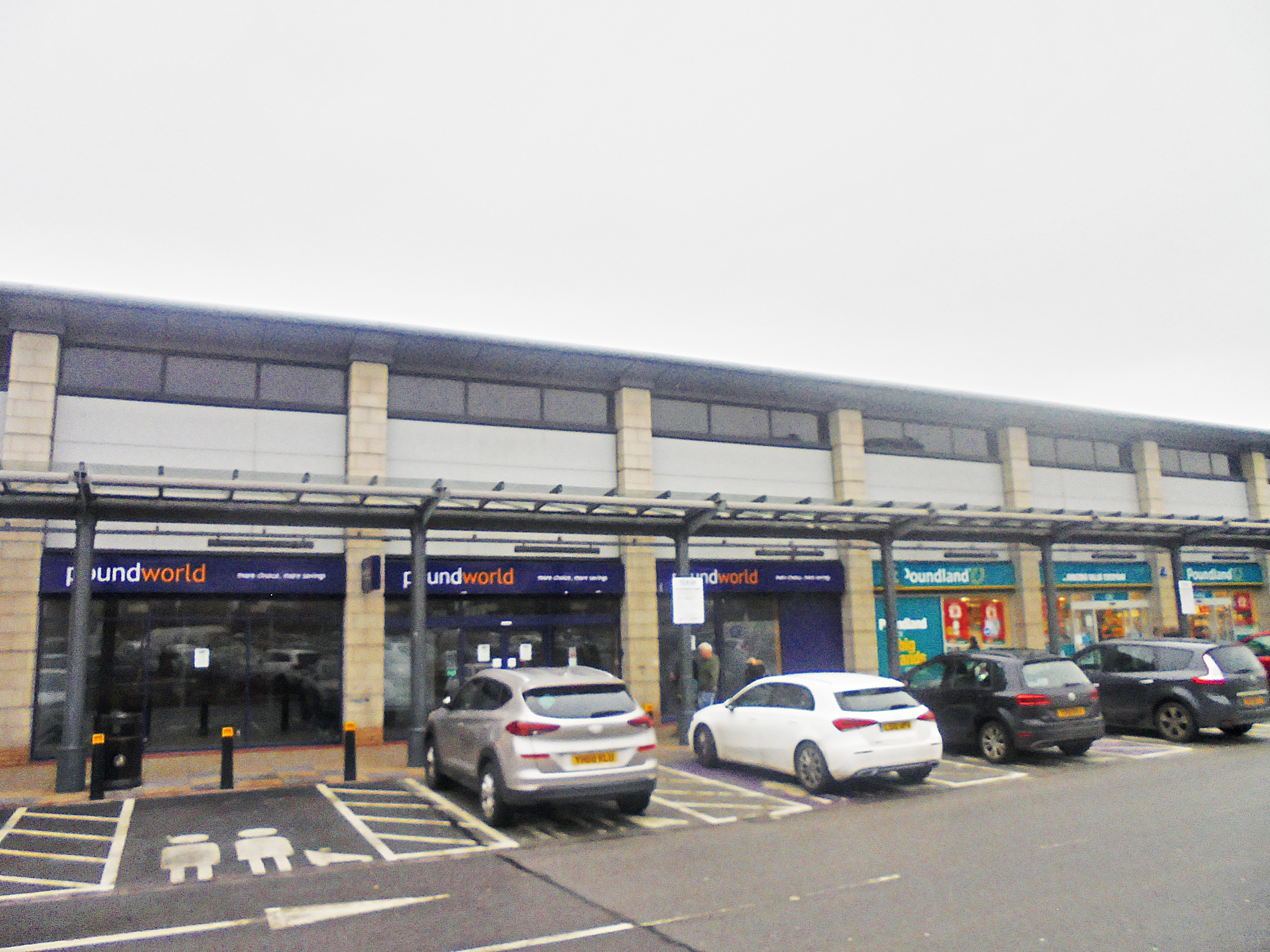
Adjacent Poundland and Poundworld branches in Seacroft, Leeds.

Since the acquisition of 99p Stores in 2015, Poundland's closest competitor was the now defunct Poundworld. Other competitors are discount retailers B&M, Home Bargains, and supermarkets.

Poundland may sometimes find they are competing with other retailers' own produce. It was reported in May 2010 that Poundland were selling rebranded lotions for £1, exactly the same product that Boots were selling under their own brand for significantly more. Boots responded to the findings by suggesting that the products available in Poundland stores were likely excess stock they had sold off below cost price which had been destined for overseas markets, with some directed into UK distribution without their permission.

Larger chains have felt the impact of discount retailers, with some customers switching from larger supermarket retailers for everyday necessities. To entice customers into their stores from larger supermarket chains, Poundland advertise familiar brands at competitive prices, in the hope that customers may then be inclined to impulse buy other products, such as own-brand goods that they otherwise would not have purchased. Asda reduced some branded product prices such as Colgate toothpaste to £1 in January 2009, in competition with Poundland who offered the same products at the £1 price; in response, Poundland introduced multi-buy offers to provide a larger quantity of the products for the same price. However, research conducted by The Grocer magazine in August 2009 found that of the 1300-odd supposedly discounted Asda products, a third were the same price as in March 2008 and 173 products had been selling for less than £1 during spring 2009.

Logo for Star Bargains

StarBargains.co.uk was another grocery retailer chain, based in Sheffield and operating throughout Europe. In March 2018, Frozen Value Ltd announced they were trading online as Star Bargains, taking over their Fulton's Foods retail trading name. The online offering excludes chilled & frozen. In January 2022, it was announced that Star Bargains would close in February and would be replaced with Poundland's new home delivery service. People were still able to place orders on starbargains.co.uk until 23 January 2022. The website closed on 31 January 2022 and was folded into the online operations of Poundland. The customer support team closed after 28 February.

=== Store expansion ===
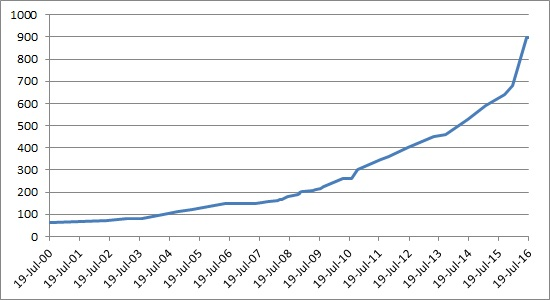
Store growth from 2000 to 2016

From 2000 until 2003, company growth was steady, with a milestone 100th store opening in Shirley, West Midlands, in 2003, yet in the following three years, store numbers had increased by 50% to 150 by 2006. Growth slowed until early 2008 when Poundland took advantage of the economic downturn to further expand at an average rate of 3.7 stores a month, from February 2008 to September 2009, opening their 200th store during this time. As of 2015, Poundland's UK and Ireland stores averaged 5,233 square feet (490 m^{2}), and typically ranged from 1,700 to 12,000 square feet (160 to 1,100 m^{2}).

The retailer expanded into Northern Ireland and opened six stores before Christmas 2009, selling locally sourced goods such as milk, as well as their usual branded products. Following the acquisition of 99p Stores, Poundland announced 80 stores were to close in November 2016, just two months after their takeover by Steinhoff International.

=== Financial performance ===
Poundland's turnover increased year-on-year until 2017, helped by an increase of store openings and the 2008 financial crisis. While some high street shops reported a downturn in profits during the 2008 financial crisis, Poundland achieved growth attributed to the 2007–2008 world food price crisis, including increased sales of toothpaste and tinned food.

Year ending	Turnover (£m)	Profit (£m)			
Year ending	Turnover (£m)	Gross	Operating	Pre-tax	Net
29 September 2024	1,818.1	657.5	−51.5	−79.2	
1 October 2023	1,771.7	653.3	25.2	0.7	
25 September 2022	1,586.1	603.6	55.6	33.9	
26 September 2021	1,544.7	583.9	54.1	33.5	
27 September 2020	1,476.6	539.1	8.6	−15.77	
29 September 2019	1,543.2	577.9	26.7	14.3	
30 September 2018	1,522.63	550.77	22.5	14.3	
1 October 2017	2,245.80	793.7	−126.5	−107.7	
31 March 2016	1,214.8	452.72	32.9	26.1	−12
31 March 2015	1,111.5	412.36	59.4	32.8	13.9
31 March 2014	997.8	368.5	54.0	27.3	−4.7
31 March 2013	880.5	323.5	30.1	26.5	23.4
1 April 2012	780.1	287.8	32.0	23.5	17.5
27 March 2011	518.4	190.8	15.7	8.5	5.1
28 March 2010	509.8	192.6	21.5	19.8	13.0
29 March 2009	396.2	150.3	11.8	8.6	4.8
30 March 2008	329.7	123.5	8.0	4.2	1.9
1 April 2007	310.7	112.9	3.6	−0.38	−1.2
2 April 2006	281.2	100.4	1.9	−1.6	−2.1

== International operations ==
Although price-point retailing and psychological pricing were first adopted in the United States during the 1870s by Frank Winfield Woolworth, the chain claims to have introduced this concept to Europe, and in 2009 claimed to be the largest single-price discount retailer in Europe.

On 2 August 2011, Poundland announced plans to expand into mainland Europe under the name Dealz. The first six stores opened in Ireland in late 2011, creating 120 jobs, and were followed by a store in the Isle of Man in December 2011. The name 'Euroland' was not used in Ireland, due to poor feedback from potential customers.

== Museum ==
A Poundland museum was created at Ludstone Hall, Claverley. This depicts the life of Steve Smith and his rise as market stall holder at Bilston Market to a multi-millionaire. The estate was put on the market in 2024 for nearly £8 million.

Poundland Museum
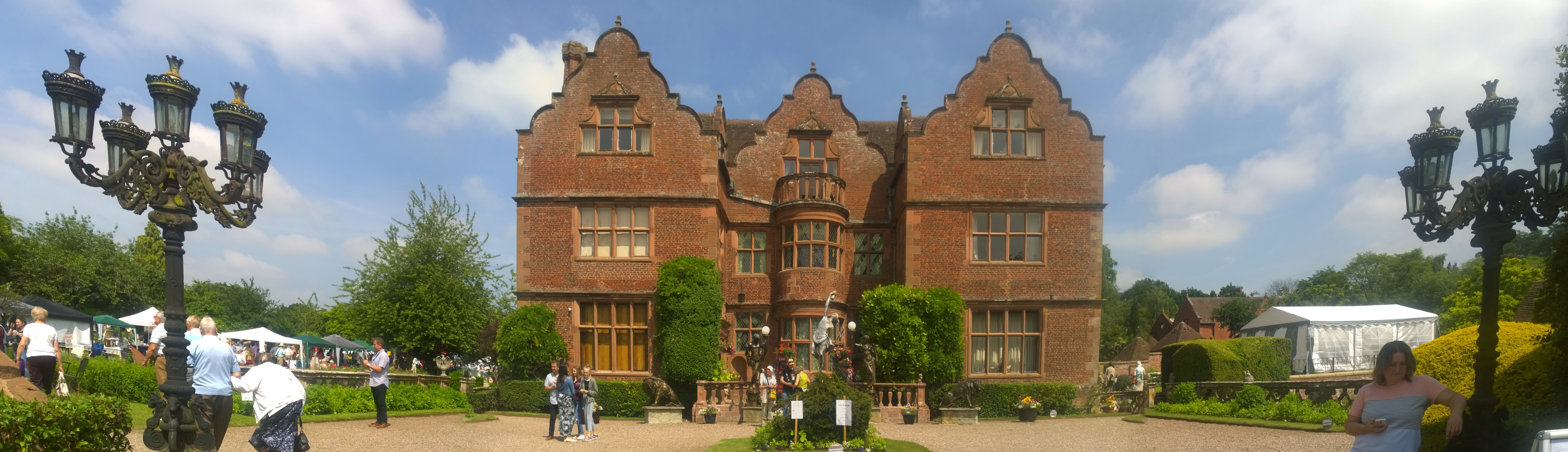
Ludstone Hall Panorama, Claverley, UK. Owned by the father of Poundland millionaire Steve Smith.

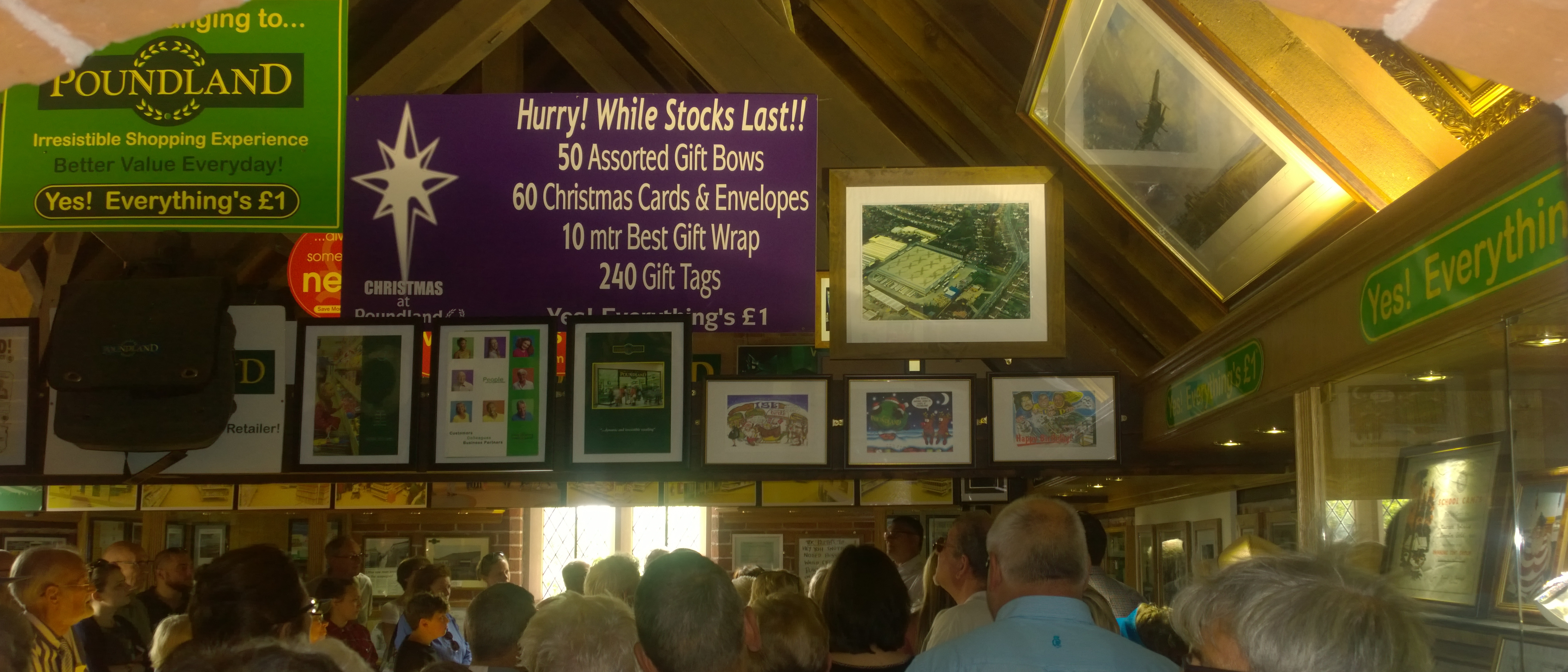
Steve Smith Poundland Museum

== Criticism and litigation ==
=== Environmental concerns ===
In 2008, Poundland faced controversy by green campaigners over transporting Polo mints into the UK from Indonesia, rather than sourcing the product locally, despite its close proximity to the Nestle Rowntree's factory in York. Poundland stated that importing the product remained cheaper, despite transport costs via ship.

=== Health and safety ===
Poundland has on several occasions faced enforcement action over product safety and store safety. These have included recalls of defective consumer products, fines relating to unsafe lighters and prosecutions for blocking fire exits, including fines in 2005 and 2011.

==== Pest infestation ====
Between 2012 and 2017, Poundland were prosecuted on several occasions over hygiene failures. Council inspections found rodent infestations, contaminated food and failures in food safety management, resulting in fines ranging from £10,000 to £100,000. The breaches were at stores in Croydon, Islington and Wandsworth, the latter of which forced the temporarily closure of the store.

=== Remembrance poppies ===
In October 2011, Poundland attracted criticism after a staff member was reportedly prevented from wearing a Remembrance poppy because of company uniform rules and was sent home. The company reversed the policy following public criticism and after hundreds of customers threatened to boycott the store.

=== #ElfBehavingBad campaign ===
In December 2017, Poundland ran a social media campaign with a series of eight sexually suggestive #ElfBehavingBad posts featuring a Christmas elf. The campaign received mixed responses on Twitter, with some users also speculating Poundland's account was hacked, but it confirmed the posts were genuine. Twinings also complained about an image featuring the elf posing with a doll in front of a box of Twinings Classics tea, leading Poundland to post a revised image without the box. In February 2018, the ASA upheld all 85 complaints it received about the campaign for depicting "toy characters and other items displayed in a sexualised manner". Poundland defended it as being based on "humour and double entendres", and also posted a tongue-in-cheek response on Twitter featuring a message from the fictional elf.

== See also ==
- Pep&Co
- Pound Shop Wars
- Variety store
- Warburg Pincus
