= Pep&Co =

British clothing chain

- Type: Retail
- Industry: Fashion
- Founded: 2015; 11 years ago 2026 (relaunch)
- Defunct: 2023 (original)
- Fate: Absorbed into Poundland and Pepco
- Headquarters: Watford, UK
- Number of locations: 82 (March 2017)
- Area served: UK
- Key people: Adrian Mountford, Managing Director
- Products: Clothing
- Revenue: £29.1m (2016)
- Net income: £-14.7m (2016)
- Owner: Gordon Brothers
- Number of employees: 492 (2016)
- Parent: Poundland
- Website: www.poundland.co.uk/pages/pep-co-clothing

Pep&Co is a British discount fashion retail chain, owned by the South African company Pepkor (a wholly owned subsidiary of Steinhoff International) and based in Watford, England.

Pep&Co opened their first store in the Newlands Shopping Centre in Kettering, Northamptonshire in July 2015. The retailer opened their first 50 stores in 50 days, an average of a store a day, with aspirations to expand up to 900 outlets.

Pep&Co opened their first "store-in-a-store" in March 2017, when they utilised space in an existing Glasgow Poundland store without affecting the range offered by the parent store. The chain announced in November 2017 that it planned to expand into the Republic of Ireland by opening a "significant number" within Dealz's stores.

In February 2020, Poundland has begun piloting a broader variety of children's clothes across 50 of its shop-in-shops at Pep&Co.

As of 2024, the Pep&Co brand is no longer used, although still appears on some store fronts, it was phased out in store by December 2023. The Poundland and Pepco brands are now used for clothing.

In 2025, Gordon Brothers (the new owners of Poundland) announced that they would be relaunching the Pep&Co brand which would replace the Pepco branded products.

== Foundation ==
Pep&Co is a value clothing chain, owned and operated by their parent company Pepkor. The concept was thought up by former Asda chief executive Andy Bond and former head of Sainsbury's clothing business Adrian Mountford, whilst in an outlet of the Starbucks chain. Bond believed there was retail capacity for a value clothing retailer following the demise of Woolworths and British Home Stores, to name a few.

Following the opening of their first store on 1 July 2015, the retailer followed with 49 further stores within the next 49 days, expanding at a rate not experienced since Next in 1982. The entire opening programme came at a cost of £20m, with stores mostly being opened in secondary towns.

== Business operations ==
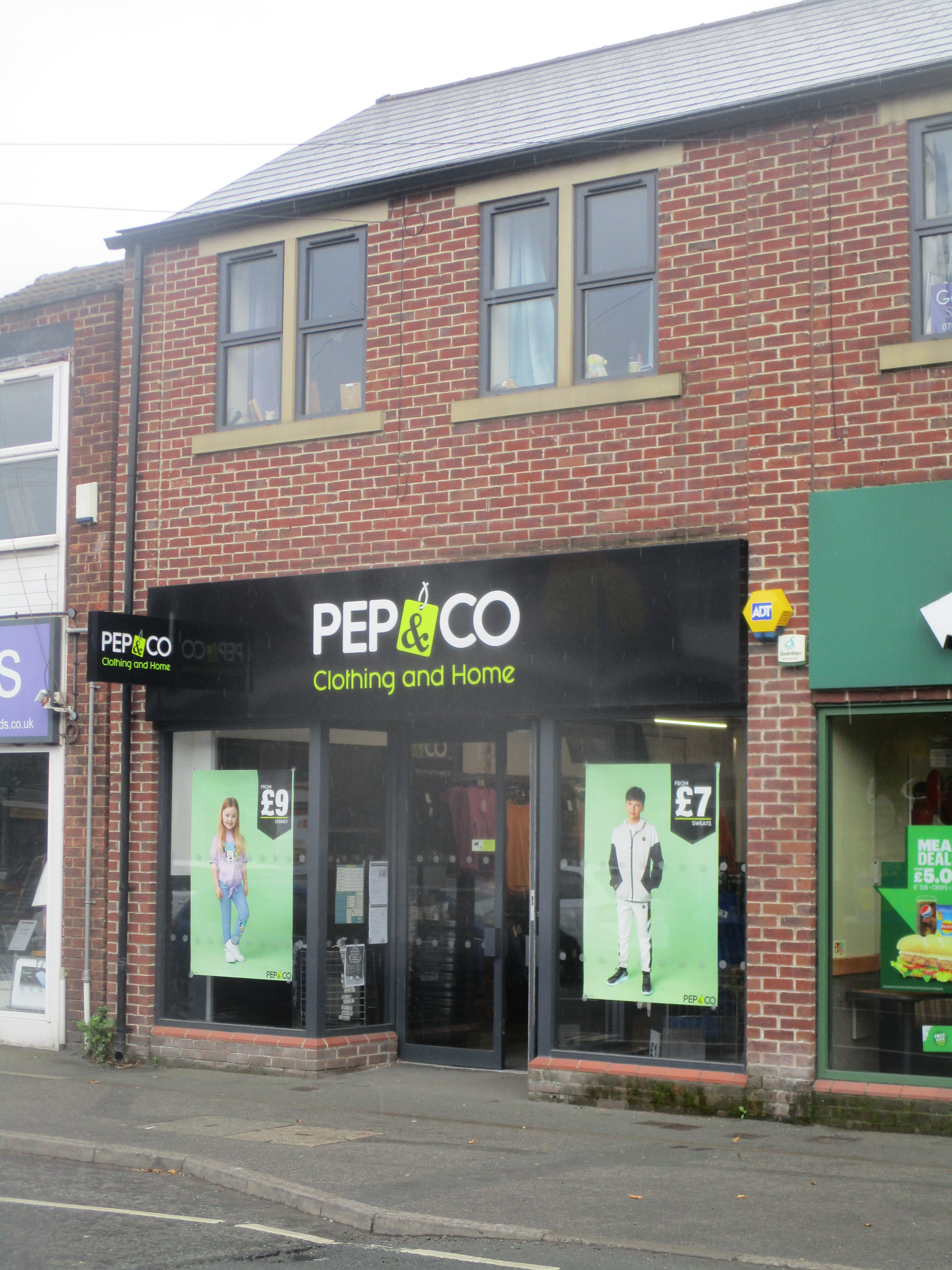
Pep&Co in Garforth, West Yorkshire.

=== Retail strategy ===
The retailer expanded rapidly during 2016, particularly in locations where similar rival Primark had no presence, with Pep&Co's managing director Adrian Mountford suggesting that they are the only retailer which competes directly with Primark on price. Other outlets have been opened within existing Poundland stores, particularly larger stores where space has allowed, further aiding the rapid progression at a faster rate than opening individual stores would. Many of the retailer's newly opened stores have been in smaller towns, where lower rent costs help ensure their pricing model is sustainable; this has been feasible largely due to bigger supermarket chains opening smaller store formats in town centres, drawing customers to those areas and creating a greater footfall. Stores are typically designed to be minimalist in aesthetics, with their Kings Heath store having a minimal roof and bare floor, which the retailer claims allows them to cut costs which can then be passed on to the consumer.

The impact of a weakened exchange rate throughout 2016-2017 had an effect on Pep&Co, with proposals to increase prices on loss-leading T-shirts with a sell price of £1, initially conceived a marketing tool to draw in customers. Whilst some of the impact of a weakening currency had been offset by higher sales and subsequently higher supplier orders, it is still not enough to fully absorb the higher import costs.

The clothing retailer uses social media as a means to market and compete with its rivals, with one particular case in February 2018 involving Primark, whereby the retailers were embroiled in a light-hearted battle regarding the price of their jeans offering; Primark had reacted to a statement from Pep&Co that the latter's jeans price were lower, which made Primark publicly lower their own price in return.

=== Products offered ===
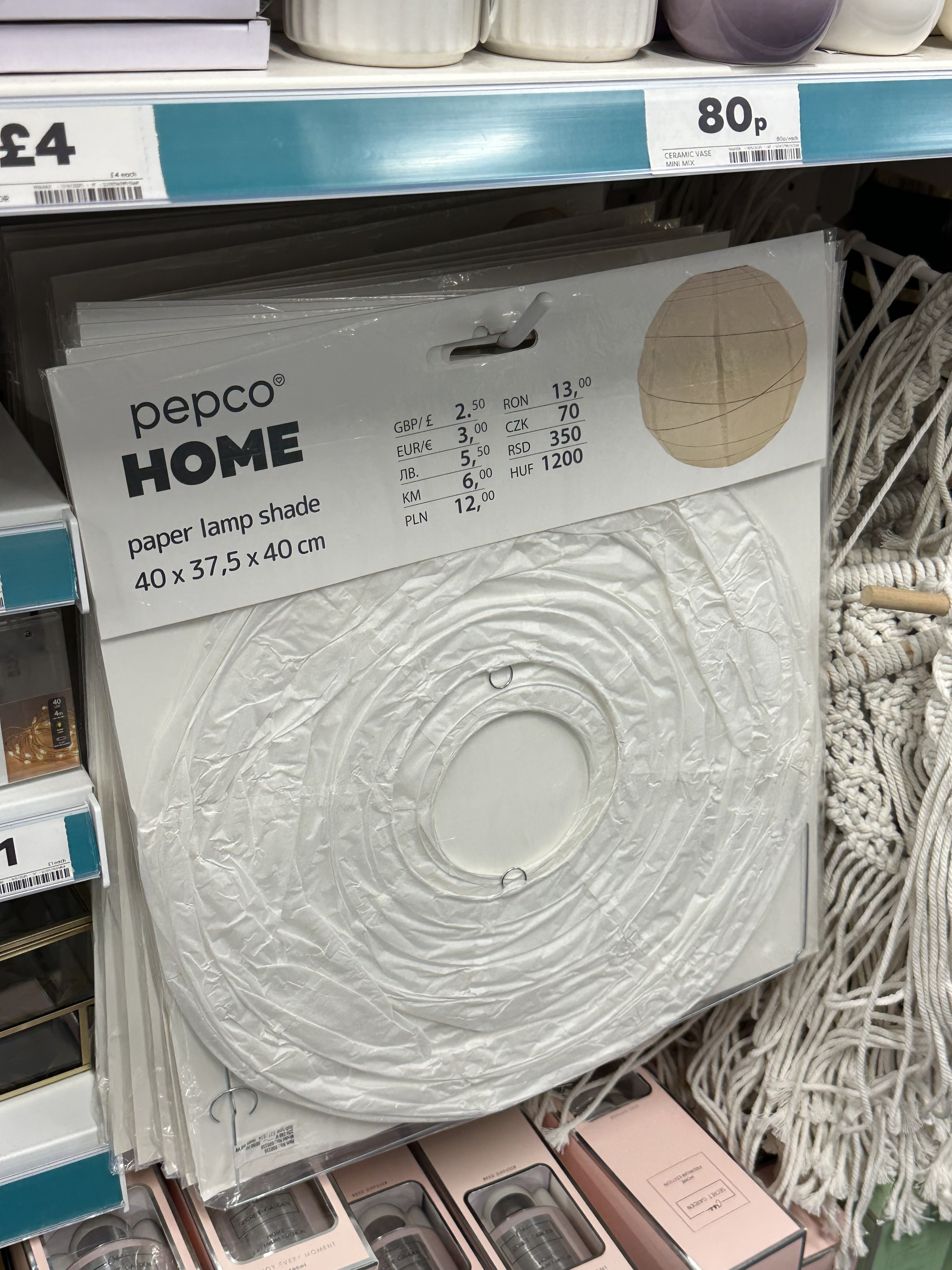
Pepco Home paper lamp shade

Pep&Co's parent company Pepkor has existing supplier relations in place with their other subsidiary chains, offering the retailer shorter lead times and an existing global sourcing network. Products on offer come with a 101-day guarantee (compared to the 100-day guarantee offered by ASDA), though many items sold are produced outside of the UK. An interview with the managing director in September 2015 discussed the lack of a menswear department since their inception several months prior, although this was addressed in November 2015, introducing essential men's clothing items such as jeans, shorts and casual shirts, with a pricing strategy broadly in line with their existing female clothing ranges.

=== Customers ===
The typical target market is primarily females in the 30-45 age bracket, as opposed to the typical younger-aged fashion market. Customers are on average slightly older than those that shop at Primark, who are better known for their offerings in younger fashion lines.

== Corporate affairs ==
=== Financial performance ===
The retailer's first 15 months of trading resulted in a net loss of £14.7m, reportedly due to administrative expenses of £22.3m despite turnover reaching £29.1m.

Year ending	Turnover (£m)	Profit			
Year ending	Turnover (£m)	Gross (£m)	Operating (£m)	Pre-tax (£m)	Net (£m)
24 September 2016 (15-month period)	29.1	7.9		-18.9	−14.7

== Media ==
The retailer featured in an ITV documentary Bargain Shop Wars in 2016, which received positive reactions from customers and helped increase footfall significantly into stores, with 35 requests a second being made online to the retailer's store locator during the initial transmissions of the programme.
