= Dealz =

Chain of discount retail stores

Dealz Poland Sp. z o.o. Poundland Limited
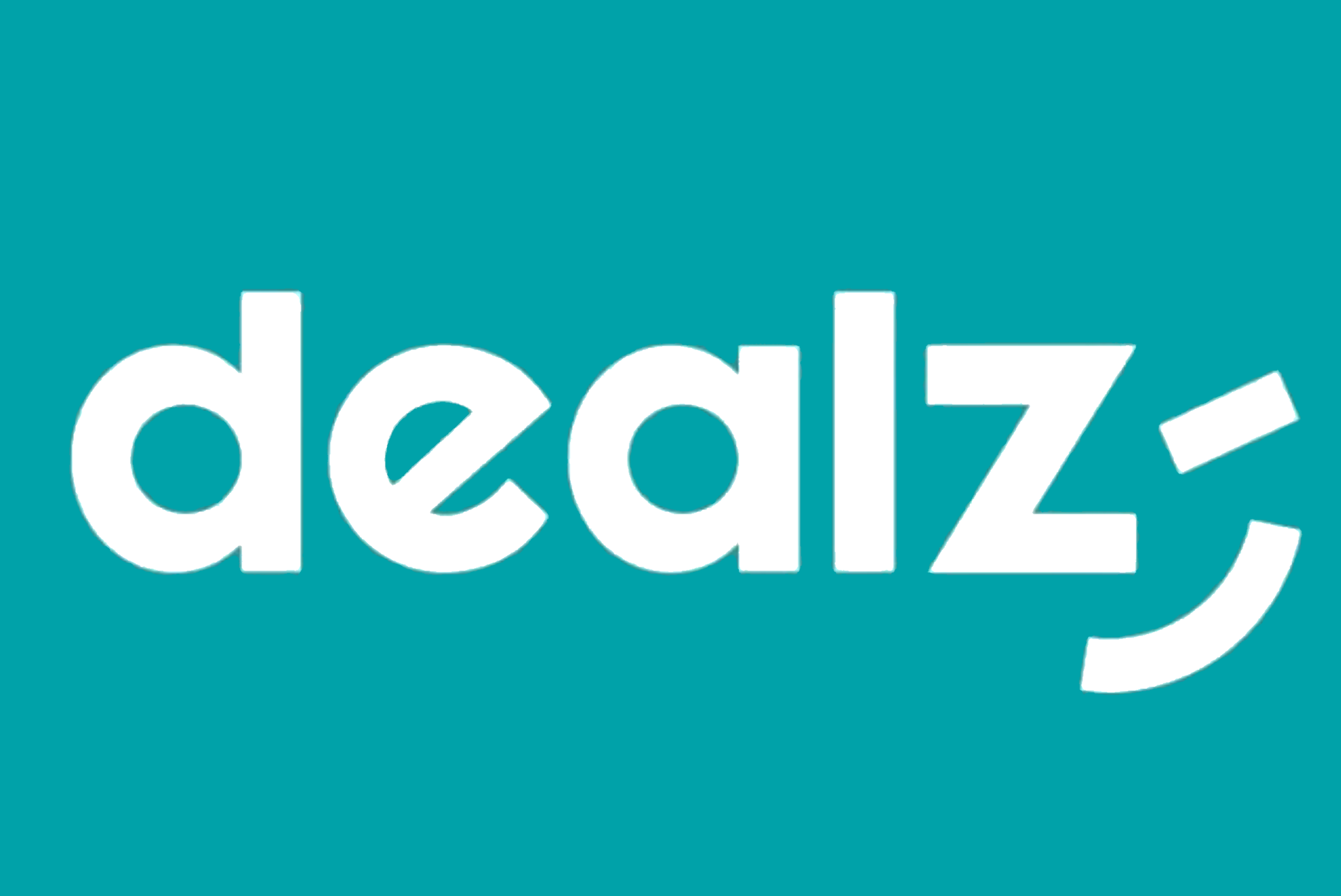
- New logo as of 2023
- Trade name: Dealz; Dealz Poland
- Type: Subsidiary
- Industry: Retail
- Founded: 17 August 2011; 15 years ago in Dublin, Ireland
- Headquarters: Poznań, Poland
- Area served: Poland; Republic of Ireland; Isle of Man
- Owner: Modella Capital (Poland); Poundland (Ireland and Isle of Man)
- Website: dealz.pl dealz.ie

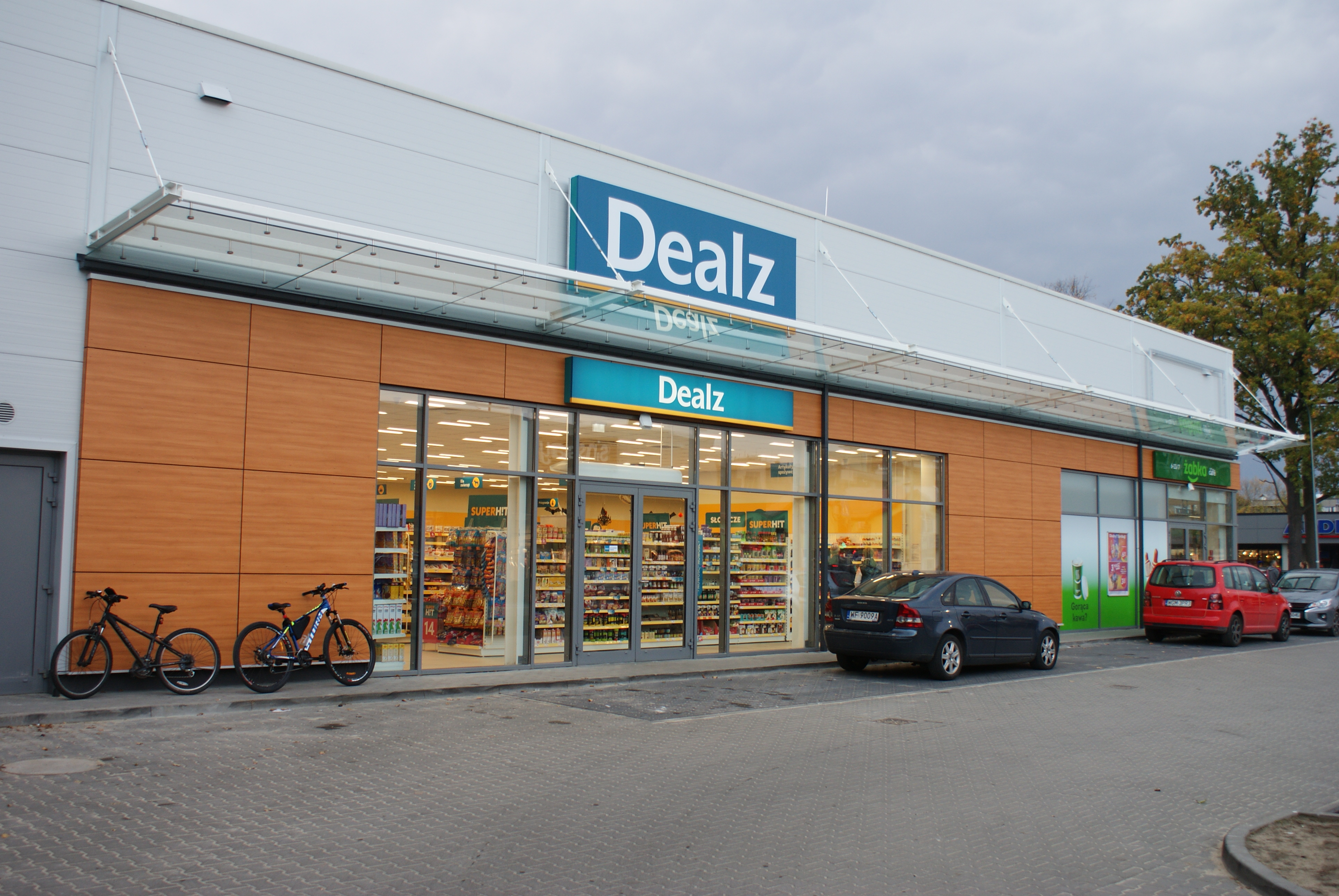
A Dealz store in Grodzisk Mazowiecki, Poland with the old logotype, October 2022.

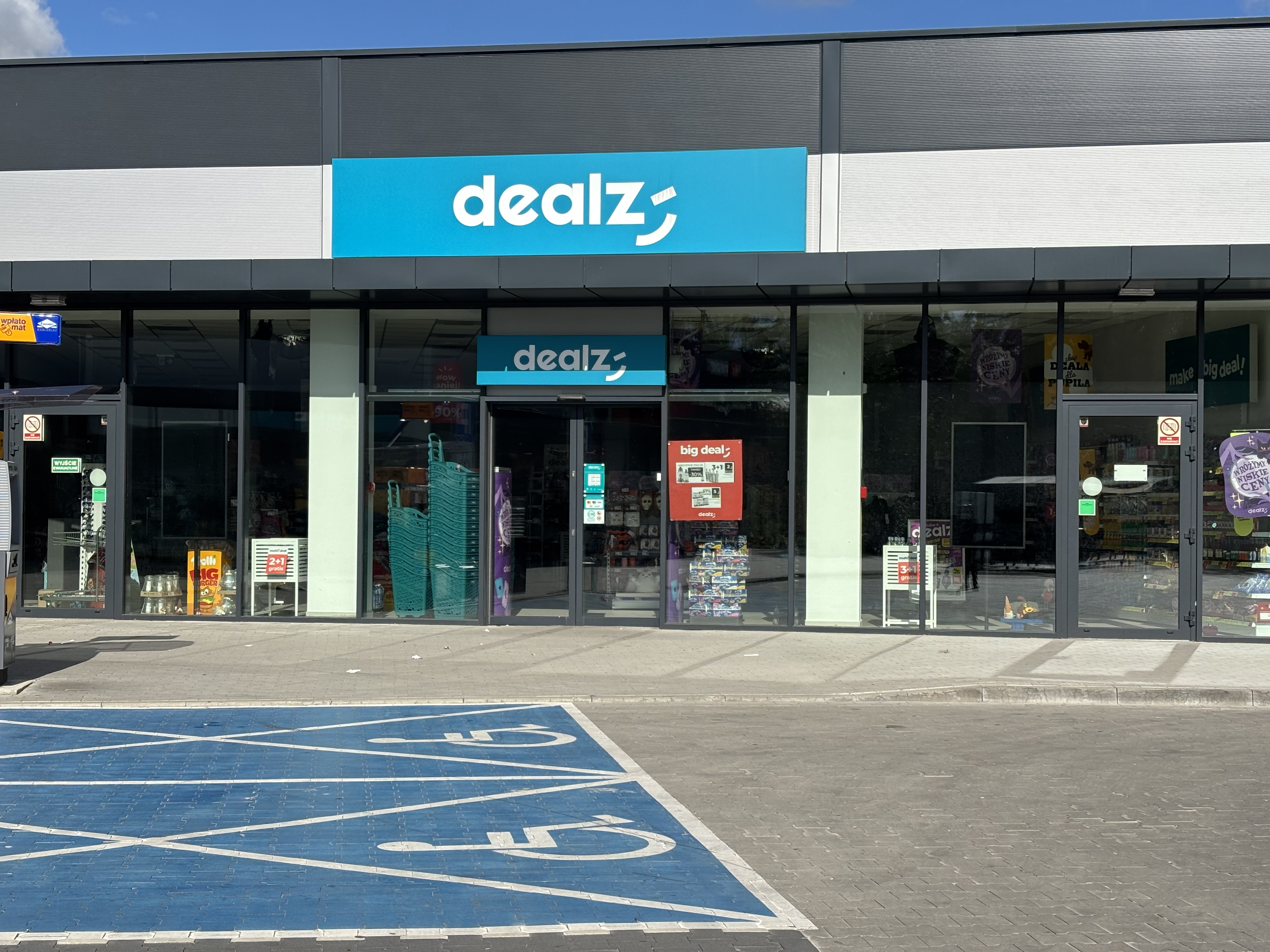
A Dealz store in Jaroty, Poland with the new logotype, September 2025.

Dealz is a chain of discount store operating in Poland, Ireland and the Isle of Man. Known as the "European version of Poundland" and formerly operated by the same parent company, Pepco Group, it offers a range of general merchandise products, the majority of which are at the fixed price of Polish złoty, euros and pound sterling currencies.

Until 2023 the brand was also active in several other European countries, including Spain and France, however it has gradually been phased out in favour of rapidly expanding Pepco branded stores with "a focus on larger shops that include a fast-moving product range alongside clothing and general merchandise" according to former Pepco CEO Trevor Masters.

In 2025, Dealz Ireland and Isle of Man was sold, along with Poundland to Gordon Brothers for a nominal £1 by Pepco Group, with Pepco retaining a minority shareholding of the new group. Pepco Group retained full ownership of Dealz in Poland, which they later sold to Modella Capital in June 2026.

== History ==
The first two Dealz stores were opened in Blanchardstown and Portlaoise in September 2011, and by September 2013, the chain had expanded to 28 stores. Additional Dealz stores also opened in islands off of Britain: one in Douglas, Isle of Man and another in Kirkwall, Orkney. Dealz expanded to these British islands because it was offering Poundland products for £1 and £1.20. In September 2012, a store opened in Kirkwall, but this became a Poundland/Pep&Co store on 26 May 2018.

In 2022, a trial began in Ireland where some Dealz stores were transformed into Pepco.

There are more Dealz stores in Poland than Ireland as of 2022.

Dealz Poundland-like logo has been entirely phased out in Poland, though is still used in Ireland on most stores as of March 2024. The new logo has begun to appear on stores, the first of which to switch being the store in Mullingar.

In 2025, Gordon Brothers acquired Dealz from Pepco Group for a nominal one pound sterling, the main Polish business was unaffected by this and would remain with Pepco.

The main Dealz business was sold to Modella Capital in June 2026.

=== Euroland ===
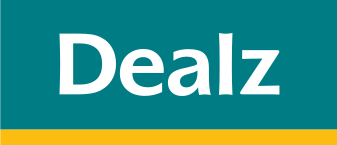
Dealz logo, in the same typeface as the former Poundland logo, still used in Ireland and Isle of Man. It was first introduced in 2013.

It was decided that the name 'Euroland' was not going to be used as it avoided the impact of price volatility in the region and because potential customers did not like the name during the European debt crisis. Also, a chain store of 45 shops with the name "Euroland" already existed in the Netherlands, making it difficult to use the name. Instead of everything being the same price, like the current Poundland model, there will be different prices. As well as offering the Poundland mix of known brands such as Kellogg's, Cadbury and Kodak, the shops will also sell locally sourced products including milk, eggs and crisps. In July 2014, Poundland opened their first store in Torremolinos, Spain and in Madrid under the Dealz España name.
