= Variety store =

Retail stores that sell general goods

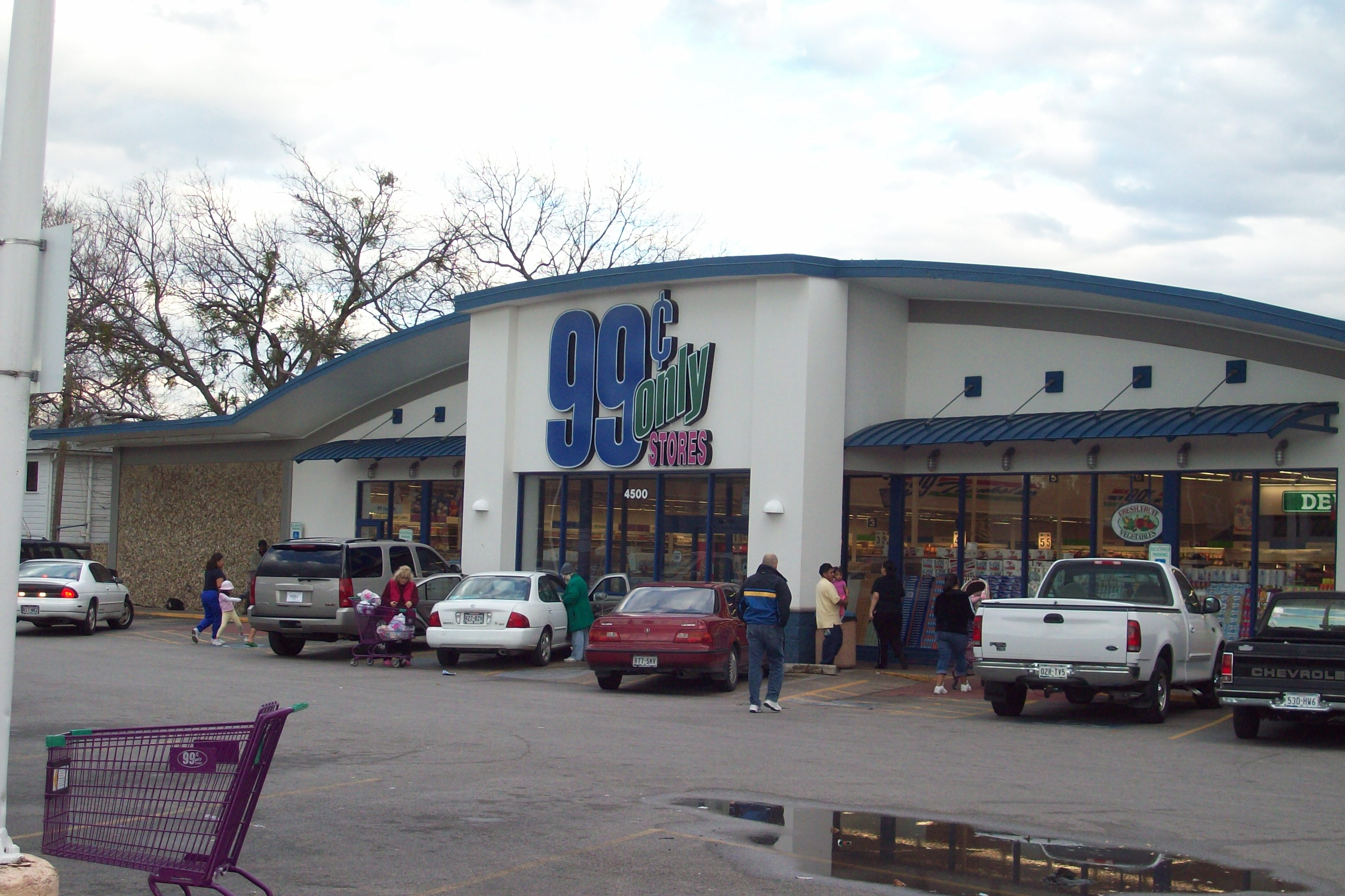
99 Cents Only Stores in Dallas, Texas

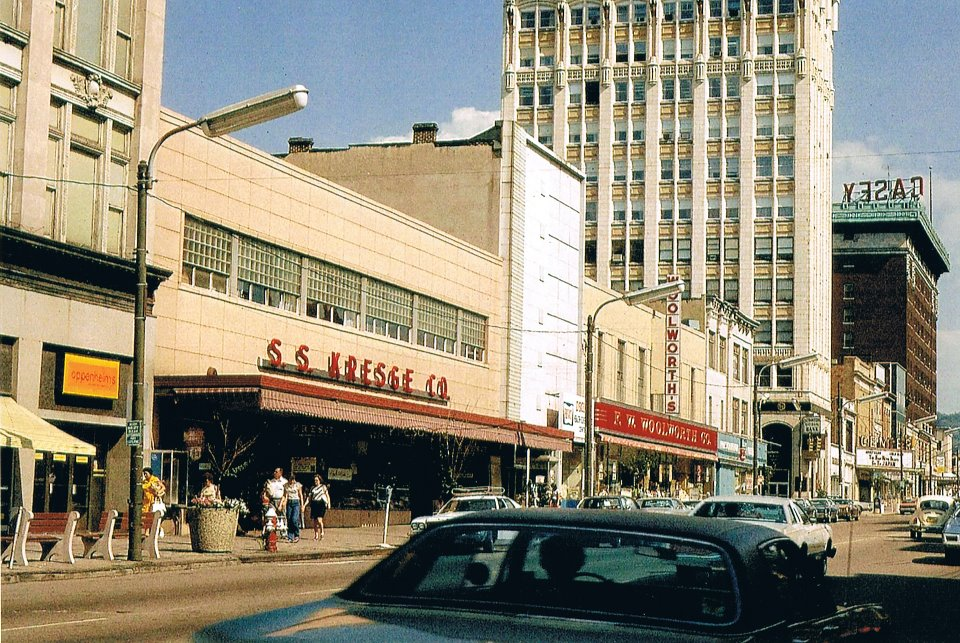
F. W. Woolworth Company and S. S. Kresge stores on Lackawanna Avenue, in downtown Scranton, Pennsylvania. The two stores were often found near each other in downtown areas. Photo circa. 1978

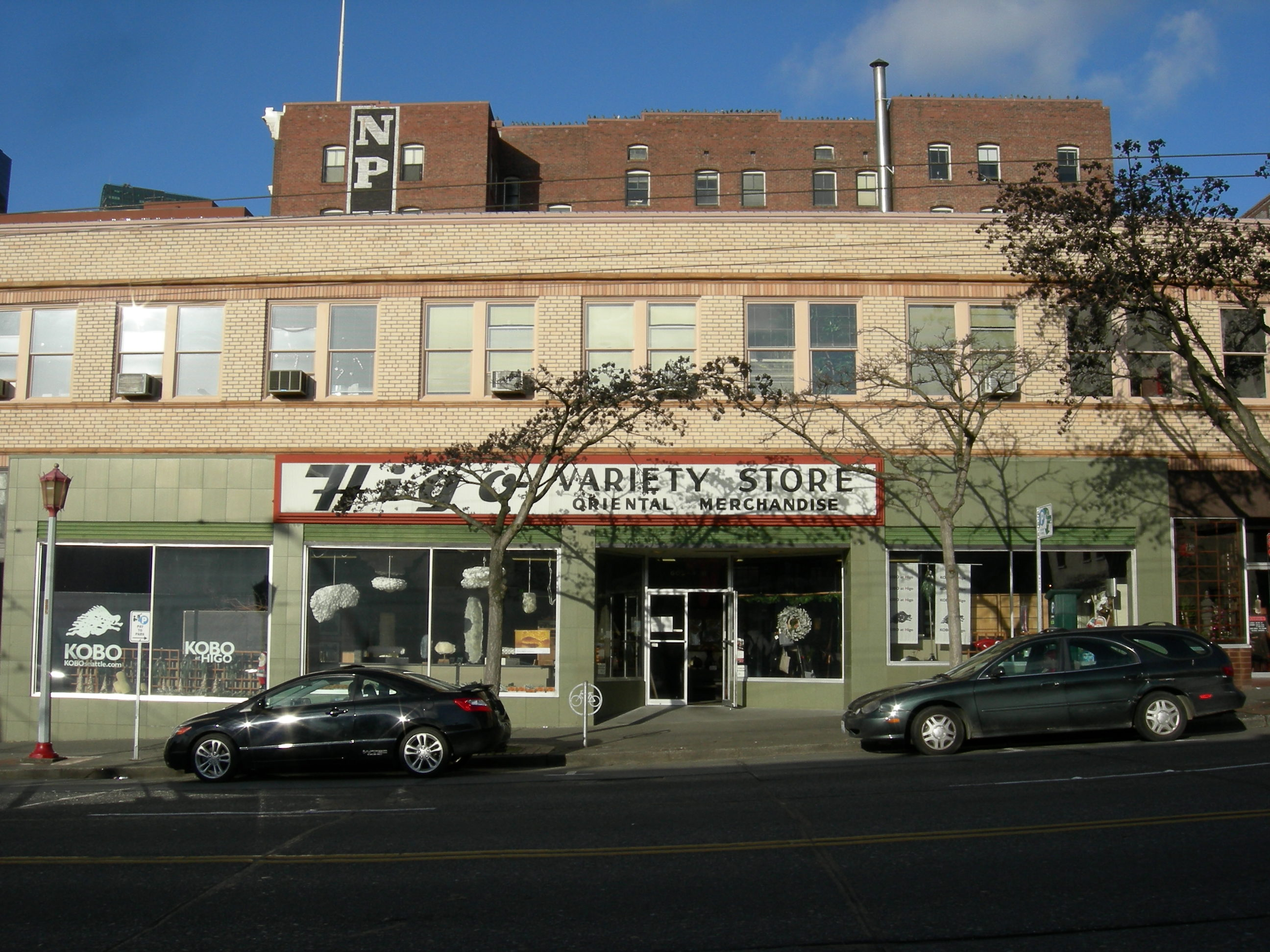
An art gallery in Seattle's International District preserves the façade and some features of Higo Variety Store, an independent Japanese-American five and ten.

A variety store is a retail store that sells general merchandise, such as apparel, auto parts, dry goods, toys, hardware, furniture, and a selection of groceries. It usually sells them at discounted prices, sometimes at one or several fixed price points, such as one dollar, or historically, five and ten cents. Variety stores, as a category, are different from general merchandise superstores, hypermarkets (such as those operated by Target and Walmart), warehouse clubs (such as Costco), grocery stores, cloth shop, slop shop or department stores.

Dollar stores that sell food have been alleged to create food deserts: areas with limited access to affordable and healthy food. This is alleged to occur when dollar stores outcompete local businesses, and soon become some of the only grocery store–like businesses available in some areas.

== Terminology ==
It may also be called a dollar store, or pound shop, historically also five and dime.

== Economics ==
=== Pricing and margins ===
Some items are offered at a considerable discount over other retailers, whereas others are at the same price point. There are two ways variety stores make a profit:

- Buying and selling vast amounts of goods at heavily discounted prices provides a small profit margin multiplied by the sales volume.
- Pricing many items at prices that are higher than regular retailers. These goods are commonly bought by consumers who perceive them to be bargains based on the heavy discounts on other items in the store. In the case of fixed price-point retailers, this can be achieved by reducing the package size.

Variety stores with single price points buy products to fit those price points (while making a profit) that are:

- generic brands or private labels, often specially manufactured using cheaper materials and processes than usual.
- available through the grey market.
- bought at a closeout sale, such as seasonal or promotional goods or bankruptcy stock.
- sold in smaller unit sizes than elsewhere.

Not all variety stores are "single price-point" stores, even if their names imply it. For example, in the United States, Dollar General and Family Dollar sell items at more or less than a dollar. Some stores also sell goods priced at multiples of the named price and, conversely, multiple items for the price. The discrepancy with the nominal price is also compounded if sales tax is added at the point of sale.

=== Supply ===
In many countries, stock can be imported from others with lower variable costs, because of differences in wages, resource costs or taxation. Usually, goods are imported by a general importer and then sold to the stores wholesale.

Another source of stock is overruns, surplus items and out-of-date food products. Real Deals, a regional dollar store in the Syracuse, New York area, is stocked almost entirely with surplus goods such as these. The legality of selling out-of-date goods varies between jurisdictions: in general, most items (with a few exceptions, particularly certain perishable food items depending on the state) can be sold in the United States regardless of their sell-by date, but in the United Kingdom it is illegal to sell goods after their "Use by" date.

=== Demography ===
Although some people may link variety stores with low-income areas, this is not always true. For example, Atherton, California has a variety store within its city limits, even though it has a median household income of nearly $185,000 a year. Studies of food discounters in Great Britain show quite a varied demographic, and 99p Stores reported an increase in higher-income customers after the 2008 financial crisis.

=== Allegations of creating food deserts ===
Dollar stores have been alleged by a number of studies, individuals, and organizations to proliferate food deserts: areas with limited access to healthy and affordable food. Dollar stores are alleged to outcompete local grocery stores, and end up being one of the few options available for purchasing food in some communities. Dollar Tree has disputed this claim; it claimed that in a number of cases it created food options in food deserts. In 2023, Dollar Tree reportedly stopped selling eggs when the price of eggs increased. In line with these allegations, a number of U.S. states have passed restrictions on where new dollar stores can be opened.

== By region ==
=== Global chains ===
Miniso is a Chinese variety store chain that specializes in household and consumer goods including cosmetics, stationery, toys, and kitchenware. In 2016, the company's sales revenue reached $1.5 billion. Miniso has expanded outside of the Chinese market and operates 1,800 stores in Asia, Europe, Oceania, Africa, North America, and South America.

=== Africa ===
In Egypt, a variety store may be called a £E2.5 shop.

=== Asia ===
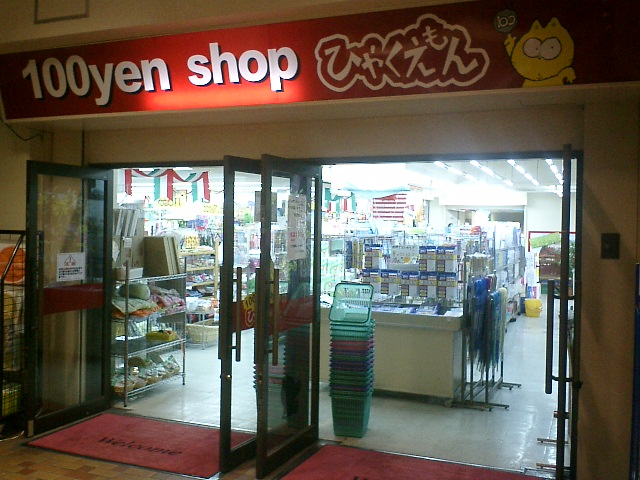
100-yen at Kōnoike, Higashiōsaka

In Japan, 100-yen shops (百円ショップ hyaku-en shoppu or 百均 hyakkin) have proliferated since around 2001. This is considered an after-effect of a decade-long recession of the Japanese economy. Despite the emphasis on value, however, some items, such as chocolate bars, may be priced higher than they are at other stores.

For a few years, 100-yen shops existed not as permanent stores, but as vendors under temporary, foldable tents. They were (and still are) typically found near the entrance areas of supermarkets.

A major player in 100-yen shops is the Daiso chain. The first store opened in 1991, and there are now around 2,400 stores in Japan. This number is increasing by around 40 stores per month. Daiso has also expanded into North America, Australia, Asia, and the Middle East.

In China, ¥2 (or ¥3, depending on the area's economic prosperity) shops have become a common sight in most cities. In Hong Kong, major department stores have opened their own $10 shops (US$1.28) to compete in the market, and there are now "$8 shops" (US$1.02) and even "$2 shops" (US$0.26) competing at lower prices, especially in poorer communities. Low prices are helped by Hong Kong's lack of a sales tax and its access to the mainland.

In Taiwan, fixed price stores can be found in many locations, including night markets, regular shopping streets, regular market stalls, and department stores. Two typical price points are NT$39 and NT$49. Given that the retail environment in Taiwan is already highly competitive, it is not unusual to see such stores fail.

In India, US Dollar Store, founded in 2003, is a pioneer of single price stores. The merchandise for pilot stores was sent from America. As sales grew over the years with more than 200 operational stores in India, the merchandise is now imported from China, Indonesia, Thailand, Spain, Portugal, UK and various other countries as well as the US. US Dollar stores were founded by entrepreneur Gaurav Sahni, owner of Nanson Overseas Private Limited. Nanson, operated by Gaurav Sahni and his brother Gautam Sahni, has had an established sourcing and consolidation network for over two decades, with supply bases worldwide. Direct sourcing without intermediaries and stocking a large variety of merchandise as and when needed has given the company an advantage.

==== Variety store chains in Asia ====
- In China: Miniso
- In India: US Dollar Store
- In Japan: Daiso, Seria, Can Do, Don Quijote
- In Pakistan: Ghazali's HomeStore, Imtiaz, Carrefour
- In Malaysia: MR.DIY, 99 Speedmart, Eco-shop

==== Names for variety stores in Asia ====
- 100 Fils Shop in Kuwait
- 2 Riyal Shop in Saudi Arabia and other Arabian Gulf countries
- 20 Qirsh (Piastres) Kuruş/ 50 Qirsh and 1 Dinar (US$1.4) shop in Jordan.
- 25 Liras (Pounds)/ 50 Liras (US $0.5 - 1) in Syria - before 2011.
- 50 or 100 Liras (New Syrian Pound) in Syria after 2024.
- 100-yen shop or one coin shop in Japan
- 10-dollar shop (US$1.28), 8-dollar shop, etc. in Hong Kong
- 1000 Won shop in South Korea
- 88 or 99 Peso store in Philippines
- 49 & 99 shop in India
- Hakol Bedollar (everything for a Dollar) in Israel
- Ghazali's HomeStore in Pakistan
- Всё по 100 рублей (English: Everything at 100 rubles) in Russia
- 10 or 20 Baht shop in Thailand
- 2-ringgit stores in Malaysia

=== Central America ===
Variety stores in Guatemala include Dollar City.

=== Europe ===
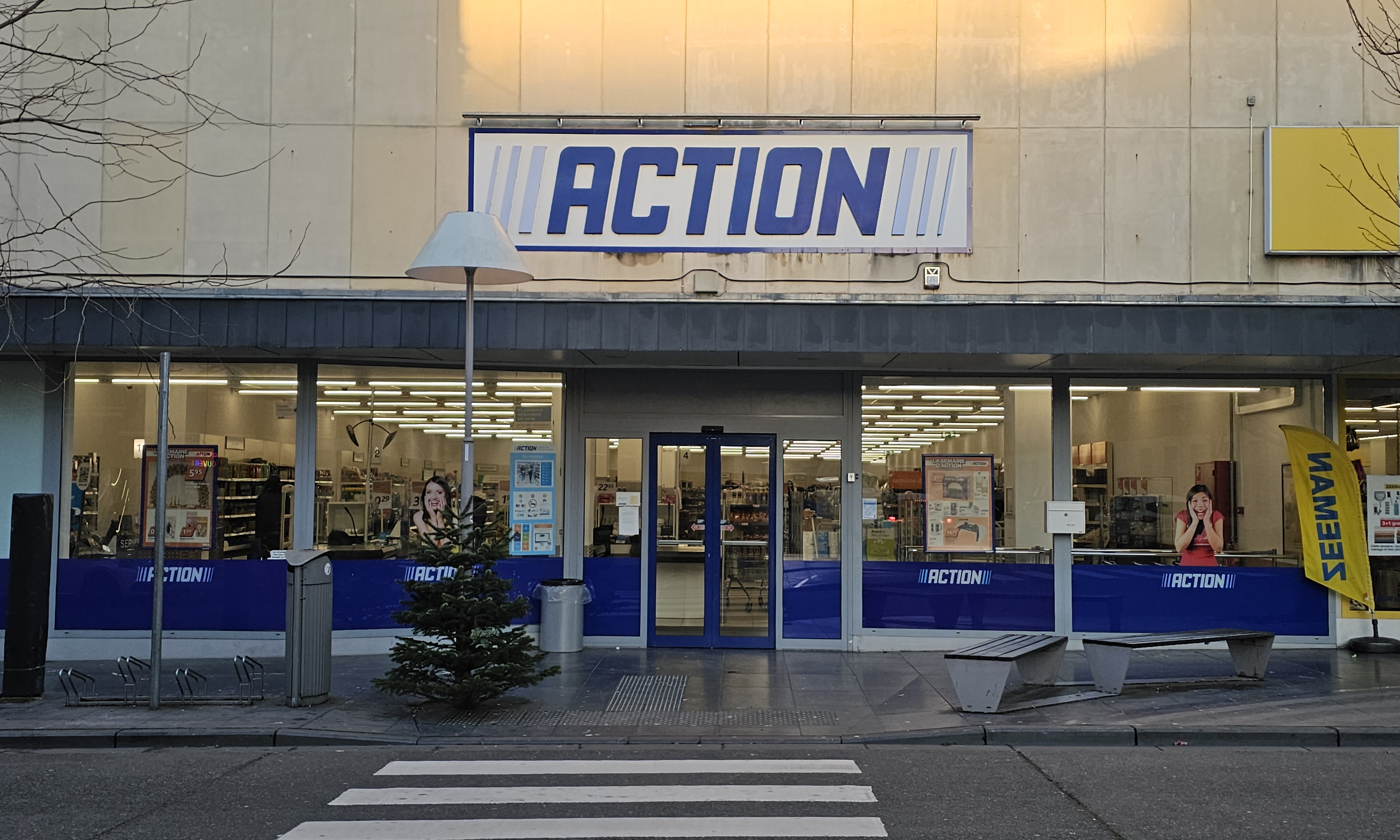
An Action store in La Louvière, Belgium

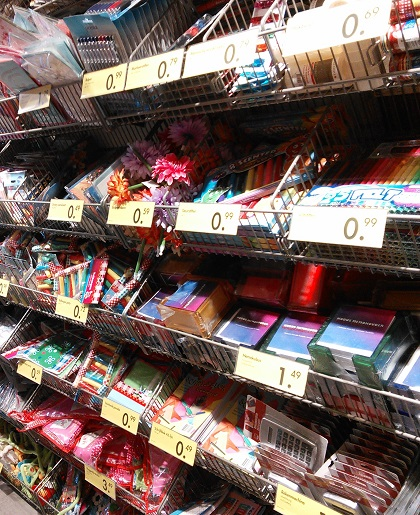
The interior of a one-euro shop in Amsterdam, Netherlands

==== European Union ====
- In Belgium, chains include Action, HEMA, and Zeeman.
- In Denmark: Tiger, a pun on the word for the Danish ten-krone coin, opened in the mid-nineties in Copenhagen and has since spread to other countries
- In France: Action, HEMA, Uniprix, M. 1-2-3. Zeeman
- In Germany, there are ToBi (German: Total Billig, "Totally Inexpensive") stores where most items cost one or two Euro or less. Other chains include Action, EuroShop, HEMA, Mäc-Geiz (240 stores), Pfennigland, Pfennigpfeiffer (110 stores), TEDi (1400 stores across Europe), Thomas Philipps (200 stores), and Zeeman
- In Greece: 300 (300 drachmas, €0.90)
- In Hungary there are 100 forintos bolt ("100 forints store") stores, but they do not form a single chain, instead of being operated by small, independent companies.
- In Ireland: EuroGiant, Dealz
- In Italy: UPIM
- In Luxembourg: HEMA, Zeeman
- In Malta: Tal-Lira
- In the Netherlands: HEMA chain started in the Netherlands, sold goods using standard prices of 10, 25 or 50 cents, and later also 75 and 100 cents. After World War II, this model could not be sustained and the standard pricing system was abandoned. HEMA is the abbreviation of Hollandish standardized prices company (Dutch: Hollandse Eenheidsprijzen Maatschappij). The HEMA had some 500 Dutch stores in 2011 and also operates in Belgium, Germany, Luxembourg and France. Since 2016 the chain is expanding in to other European countries such as Spain and the United Kingdom. Other chains include Action, Big Bazar, Euroland, and Zeeman.
- In Portugal there were Trezentos shops (300 escudos, €1.50), but with the introduction of the Euro currency, this designation is not used nowadays and the terms 'bazar' or 'euro store' are preferred. Chains include Eupoupo - Tudo a €0,99 ou €1,49
- In Spain there are Todo a 100 shops ("everything for 100 pesetas" (€0.60)), although due to the introduction of the euro and inflation, most products cost a multiple of €0.60 or €1. Most of these shops maintain their name in pesetas, and most of them have been renamed as Casi todo a 100 ("almost everything for 100 [pesetas]"), Todo a 100, 300, 500 y más ("everything for 100, 300, 500 or more") or Todo a un euro. Colloquially, the expression todo a 100 implies that something is either cheap, kitsch or low quality.
- In Sweden: Bubbeltian, called by some Tian, a colloquialism for ten kronor, US$1.20. Another chain that has been spreading in Sweden during the last seven years is Dollarstore, a chain where everything costs either 10, 20, 30, 40, 50 and steps of 50 up to 500 kr.

==== Russia ====
In Russia, Fix Price started selling all its items at 30 roubles and as the business grew, up to 55 roubles. It has now cancelled this practice and has become a typical discount store).

==== United Kingdom ====
Marks & Spencer opened a stall in Kirkgate Market Leeds in 1884, proclaiming "Don’t ask the price, it’s a ’Penny". Woolworths opened its first store in the United Kingdom in 1909, when they were also colloquially known as "threepenny and sixpenny" stores, "3d and 6d" being displayed on the shops' frontages. More modern counterparts include B&M, Boyes, Home Bargains, OneBeyond, Poundland and Poundstretcher.

==== Names for variety stores in Europe ====
- 1 milyoncu in Turkey
- 100 forintos bolt in Hungary
- 3,8 RON shop in Romania
- Всичко по 1 лев in Bulgaria
- Euro store, €2 store, etc. in the Eurozone
- Euroshop or 1-Euro-Shop in Germany
- Loja dos 300 in Portugal (300 pre-euro escudos = €1.5)
- Magasin à prix unique (one price store) in France
- Max20 (kroner) in Norway
- Pound shop, 99p shop, etc. in the United Kingdom
- Sve po 8/10/12 kuna in Croatia
- Sve za 79/99/100 dinara (Everything for 79/99/100 dinars) in Serbia
- Tal-Lira in Malta (lira was Malta's pre-euro currency)
- Todo a 100, 20 duros and SuperCien in Spain (cien = 100 pre-euro pesetas = €0.60)
- Wszystko za 5 złotych in Poland

=== North America ===
According to IBISWorld, dollar stores have grown 43 percent since 1998 and have become a $56 billion industry. Colliers International claims there are more dollar stores than drug stores. With stores of other types closing in large numbers, dollar stores often replace other types of stores in shopping centers. They succeed partly because of impulse purchases. The common term in North America for a small general merchandise store is general store.

==== US five and dime stores ====
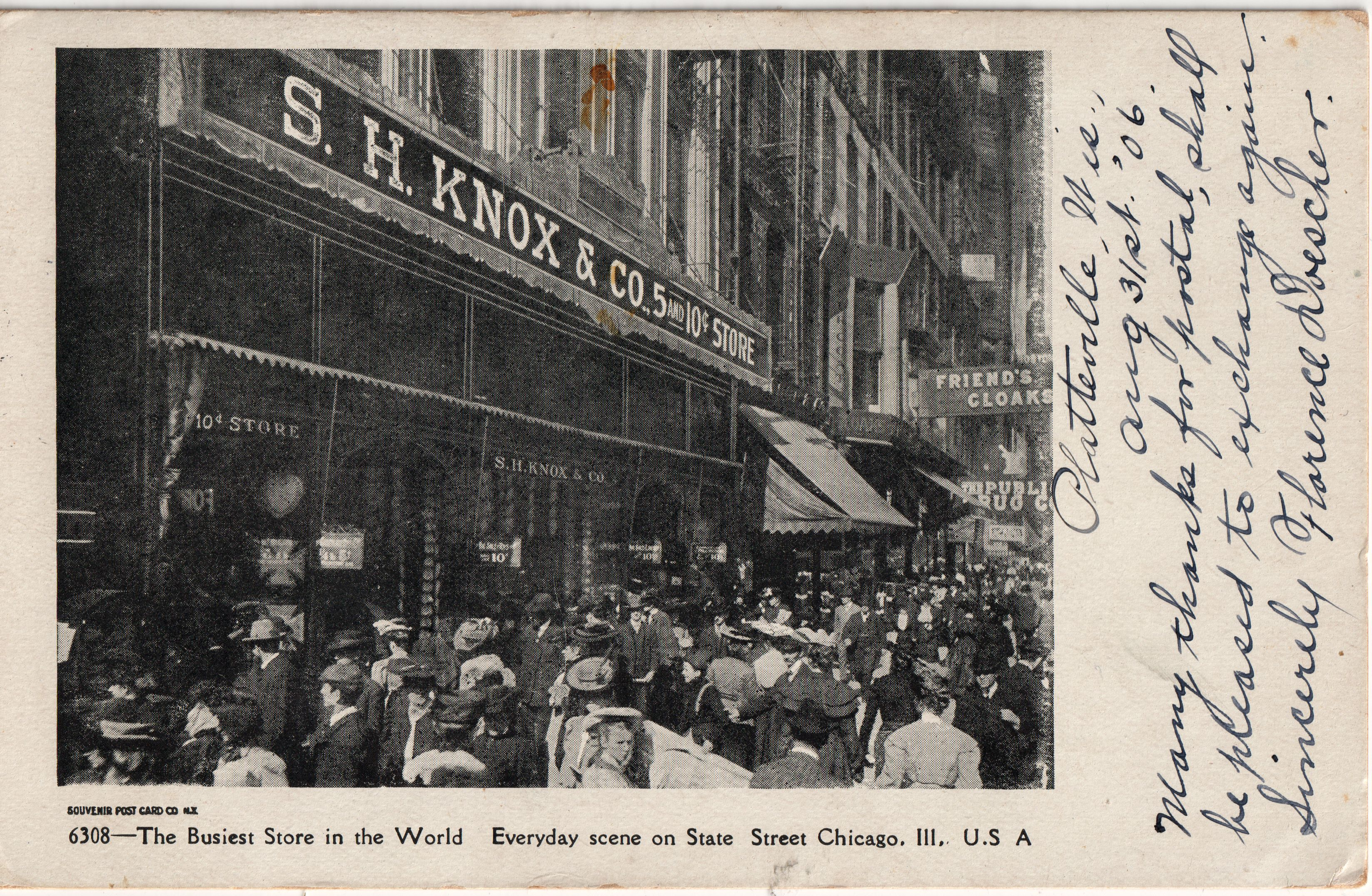
Crowds outside S. H. Knox & Co 5 and 10 cent store, Chicago, circa 1906

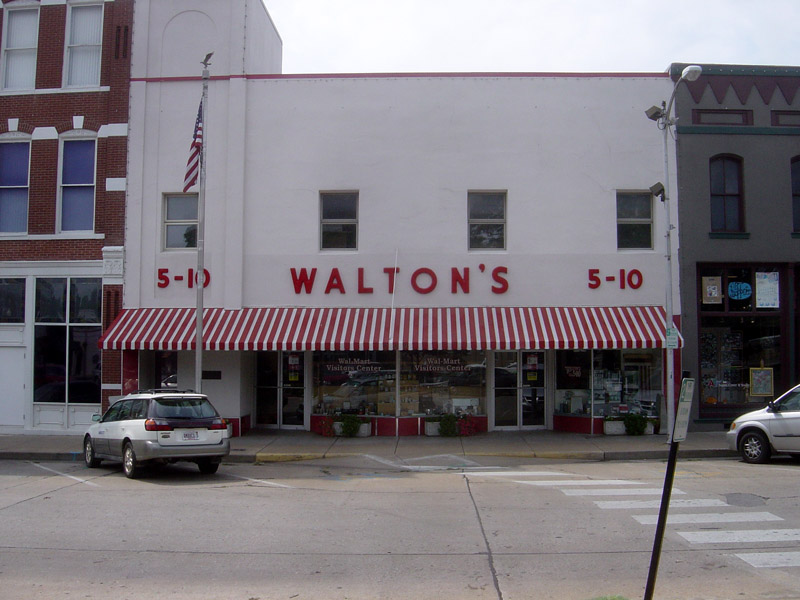
Walton's Five and Dime Store in Bentonville, Arkansas, the first store of what would eventually become Walmart.

Frank Winfield Woolworth had seen the success in Michigan and western New York of so-called nickel stores, where everything cost five cents (a nickel). On February 22, 1879, Woolworth opened his Great Five Cent Store in Utica, New York, which created the American institution of the "five and dime", and became the F. W. Woolworth Company.

There were many names for this type of store:

- five and ten cent store, five and ten, five and dime (a dime is the name of a US ten-cent coin).
- dime store
- 5, 10 & 25c stores
- five cent to one dollar stores

Before Woolworth, the prevailing thought was that an entire store could not maintain itself with low-priced goods only, but with Woolworth's success, many others followed their lead.

Well-known dime store companies included:

- Ben Franklin Stores
- Butler Brothers
- Duckwall-ALCO
- G. C. Murphy
- H. L. Green
- J. G. McCrory's
- J. J. Newberry's
- John's Bargain Store
- McLellan Stores
- Morgan and Lindsey
- Neisner's
- S. H. Kress & Co.
- S. S. Kresge Co.
- Sprouse-Reitz
- TG&Y
- Walton's Five and Dime
- W. T. Grant
- Woolworth's

Of these, only Ben Franklin continues to exist in this form, while Kresge became Kmart and Walton's became Walmart. Beginning around the 1960s, others tried the larger "discount store" format, such as TG&Y Family Centers, W. T. Grant, and Woolworth's Woolco stores.

With suburbanization in the 1950s and 1960s, Americans shopped more and more in malls rather than downtown shopping districts and although Newberry's and Woolworth's stores did open in the malls, starting around the 1970s, variety stores lost business to other retail formats such as office stores, low-price shoe chains, fabric stores, toy stores and discount drug stores such as Thrifty Drug Stores. Grocery stores and drug stores sold more and more candy. The last US Woolworth's closed in 1997. Newberry's was sold to McCrory, who maintained the brand, in 1972; McCrory itself went bankrupt in 1992 and all its brands disappeared in 2002.

==== Dollar stores ====
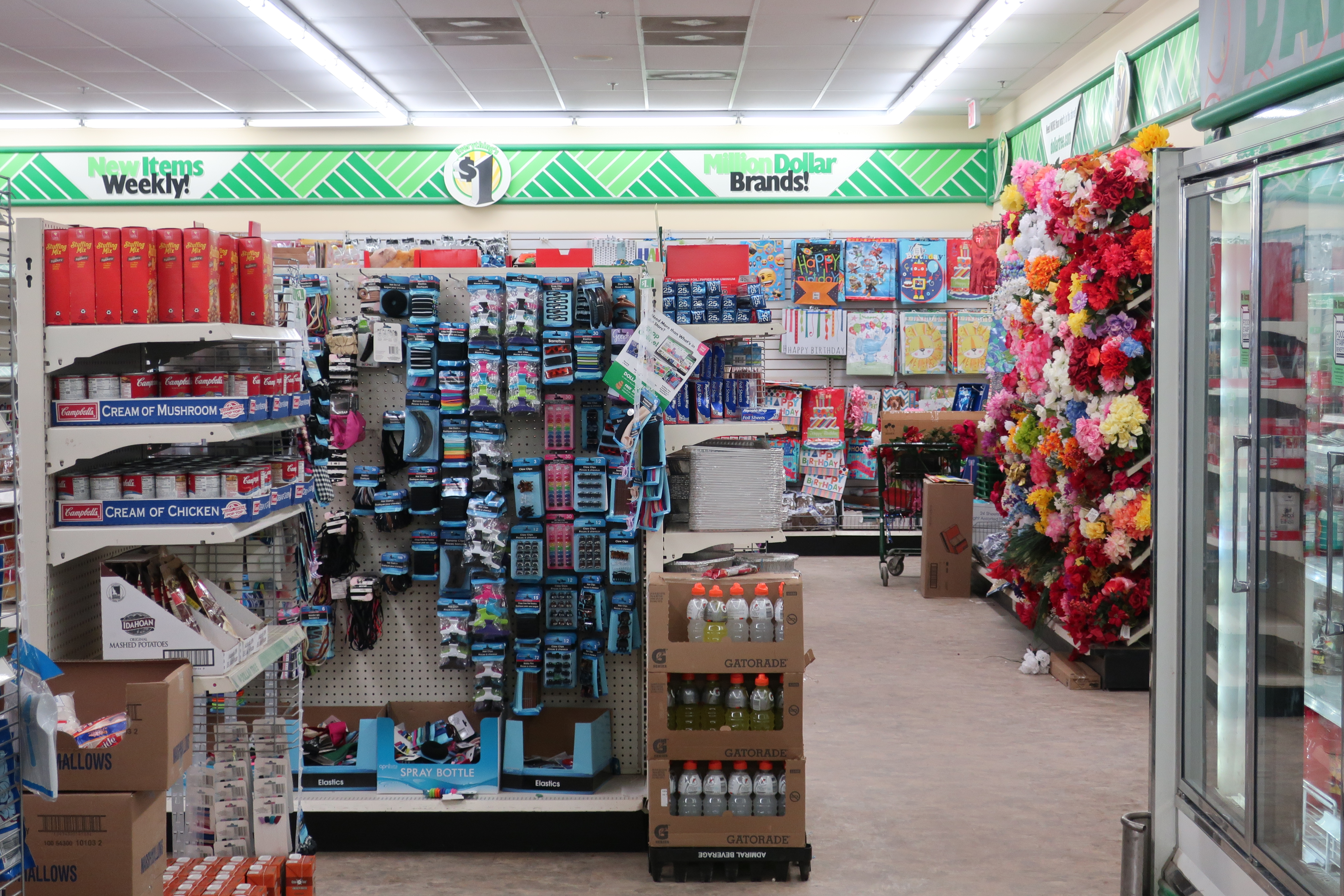
Interior of a Dollar Tree in Gillette, Wyoming

Starting in the late 1990s, dollar stores expanded enough to gain the attention of the national press. They were popular not only for their value but because freestanding smaller stores were located in small towns, downtowns, and across the cities and suburbs, they were often more convenient than mall stores. They continued to grow and by 2019, for example, Dollar Tree had higher annual sales than Macy's. Dollar and variety store revenue reached $77 billion in 2018.

As of 2018, main dollar store chains in the U.S. were Dollar General, Dollar Tree, (which owned Family Dollar until 2025), the 99 Cents Only Stores, and Five Below. Increasing revenue has led to growth for dollar store chains: by 2018, Dollar Tree had 14,000 locations in the U.S., and its expansion continued; in 2019, Dollar General had 15,000 locations in the US, and its expansion continued; and Five Below had 745 stores.

In Canada: A Buck or Two (163+), Dollarama (1,095), Dollar Tree Canada (226), Great Canadian Dollar Store (100+), Your Dollar Store With More (180+)

In Mexico: Waldo's Dollar Mart, PesoRama (JOi Dollar Plus stores)

==== Other chains in North America ====
- In Mexico: Prichos, Miniso.
- In the United States: Daiso (68), Five Below (522)

==== Names for variety stores in North America ====
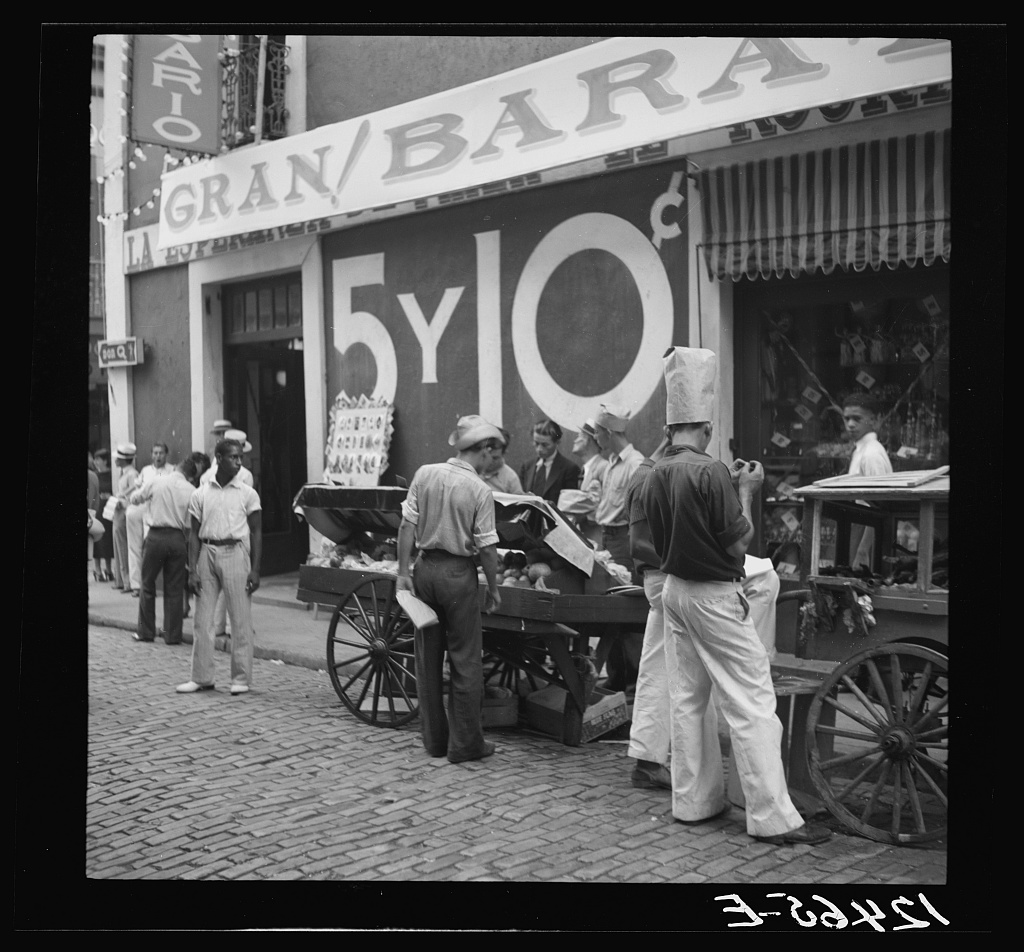
5 y 10 in San Juan, Puerto Rico in 1937

- Dollar store, $1.25 store, 99-cent store, etc. in the United States and Canada plus other names. Dollar store is used predominantly, even when the maximum price is higher than one dollar. Some chains emphasize that the price is an even amount: $2, $5, etc., instead of having odd, "uneven" prices.
- Dólar y Algo Extra, La Reina, Almacenes Caravana in Puerto Rico
- dime store
- Five and Dime
- Five and Ten
- Nickel and Dime
- Nickel and Ten
- 5 y 10 in Puerto Rico, and in Mexico (5 and 10 pesos, or 5 and ten U.S. cents in border cities) - incidentally, Cinco y Diez, meaning "Five and Ten" in Spanish, became an inner-suburban shopping district in Tijuana

=== Oceania ===
- In Australia the main variety stores now consist of The Reject Shop, Daiso, Shiploads (in Tasmania), Silly Solly's, and a variety of smaller chains and independent shops. Former chains include Crazy Clark's, Homeart, Sam's Warehouse, Clint's Crazy Bargains, Go-Lo and Chickenfeed.
- In New Zealand: The $2 Shop, 1 2 3 Dollar Shop, and Coin Save

==== Names for variety stores in Oceania ====
- The $2 shop in Australia and New Zealand
- Cheap Shop in Australia only

=== South America ===
In Argentina, variety stores are called todo por dos pesos (everything for 2 pesos).

Brazilians sometimes use the expression um e noventa e nove (R$ 1,99) to refer to cheap, low quality things or even people.

In Chile, they are called todo a mil (referring to the one thousand Chilean pesos banknote). They are commonly located in middle-class neighbourhoods where big retail stores don't usually venture and in small commercial districts like the ones in Santiago.

Variety stores in Colombia include Dollar City (Colombia version of Dollarama), D1, Ara, Miniso

In South America, variety stores may be known as:

- Dolarazo (US$1.00) and Cincuentazo (US$0.50) in Ecuador
- Loja de 1,99 (R$ 1,99 = US$1.07) in Brazil
- Todo por 23 pesos in Uruguay (23 pesos = US$1)
- Todo por dos Pesos in Argentina (1 peso = US$0.32)

== See also ==
- 100-yen shop
- General store
- Marketing
- Types of retail outlets
