= The Warehouse Group =

New Zealand retail group

- Formerly: The Warehouse Limited
- Type: Public Company
- Traded as: NZX: WHS
- Industry: Retail
- Founded: North Shore, New Zealand; May 1982; 44 years ago (Store); 1991; 35 years ago (Group)
- Headquarters: Northcote, Auckland
- Number of locations: 249 (2022)
- Key people: CEO: Mark Stirton
- Revenue: ▲NZ$3,071,357,000 (2018–19)
- Operating income: ▲NZ$102,943,000 (2018–19)
- Net income: ▲NZ$94,064,000 (2016–17)
- Total assets: NZ$1,113,852,000 (2017)
- Total equity: NZ$486,389,000 (2017)
- Owner: Sir Stephen Robert Tindall (27.01%); The Tindall Foundation (21.31%); James Pascoe Group (19.80%); Foodstuffs Nominees Limited (2.99%)
- Number of employees: 12,000
- Divisions: Group Sourcing Support; Insight Traders; Schooltex; International Brands; CES; Big Bucket Deals; Third Party Sourcing; SRO & HK Sourcing; Bargin Sourcing
- Subsidiaries: Subsidiary List: The Warehouse; Warehouse Stationery; Noel Leeming; 1-day
- Website: thewarehousegroup.co.nz

The Warehouse Group (TWG) is the largest retail group in New Zealand, consisting of the Warehouse, Warehouse Stationery and Noel Leeming. Headquartered in the Auckland suburb of Northcote, it was established by Stephen Tindall in 1982 and it is a public company listed on the NZX exchange.

== History ==
"The Warehouse" logo used up to 2006. No stores in New Zealand use this version anymore. All stores in Australia used this logo until they were renamed in 2008.

The first Warehouse Group store opened in Wairau Road North Shore, Auckland in 1982. In 1994, Warehouse was added to the New Zealand Exchange under the symbol TWH. In 1996, a distribution center opened on the North Island. In 2000, it was added to the NZSE 10 index. The group acquired Clint's Crazy Bargains and Silly Solly's in Australia that same year.

In 2003, the Warehouse Australia brand was launched. In 2005, a lab store was launched in the Hamilton suburb of Te Rapa. That same year, the Warehouse brand was relaunched with new lower-case logo, announced its plan to enter the liquor market and that it would end operations in Australia by Christmas. In 2005, Warehouse Australia was sold to Catalyst Investment Managers and Castle Harlan Australian Mezzanine Partners for A$92 million (NZ$99m).

In 2006, the Warehouse began selling alcoholic beverages in selected stores and launched a new set of stores branded the Warehouse Extra at Sylvia Park, Auckland, which included full grocery as well as pharmacies, cafés, and bakeries. At the time, the stores were considered an unproven experiment and many viewed them as an emulation of the American Wal-Mart model. However, due to supply chain issues, the Warehouse Extra stores were closed in 2009.

In 2007, the company celebrated its 25th anniversary and marked the occasion by releasing 13,000 balloons, causing concerns from environmentalists. In 2009, the first smaller-concept store, the Warehouse Local, opened in Mosgiel. In 2010, the Warehouse opened a store in Gisborne, New Zealand, the first large format store since the opening of The Warehouse Sylvia Park in 2006. In 2012, the Warehouse ceased its instore pharmacy offer. Later that year, the Warehouse announced it was buying the electronics retailer The Noel Leeming Group for $65 million.

In 2013, the Warehouse Group held a one-day online-only sale across all brands in the group called Click Madness. During that same year, the company purchased Torpedo7, No. 1 Fitness, Shotgun Supplements, Insight Traders, and Shop HQ, the latter of which included the online pet retailer, pet.co.nz, and the online baby product company, baby.co.nz.

In 2014, the Warehouse Group bought R&R Sport and SchoolTex. That same year, the company launched the Warehouse Group Financial Services after the takeover of Diners Club NZ. In 2014, the group purchased the New Zealand-based branches of Australian retail chain The Good Guys, turning their five New Zealand-based stores into their various retail brands. In July 2017, the Warehouse Group announced that it intended to sell the Financial Services division that it had acquired in 2014 to SBS Bank for a reported $18 million by September. In 2018, the group purchased the Appliance Shed brand to create the Noel Leeming Clearance Centre brand. In 2019, the company launched TheMarket, a new online marketplace selling local and international brands.

In June 2020, the Warehouse Group announced that 1,080 jobs would be lost as a result of the economic effects of the COVID-19 pandemic in New Zealand. The company also announced that it would be closing down six stores including the Warehouse stores in Whangaparaoa, Johnsonville, Dunedin, the Warehouse Stationery in Te Awamutu, and the Noel Leeming stores in Henderson and Tokoroa.

On 20 July 2020, the company's COO Pejman Okhovat announced that between 500 and 750 jobs may be lost due to a proposed restructuring of the company. First Union general secretary Dennis Maga criticised the company for using COVID-19 as an excuse to lay off hundreds of workers and to reduce the incomes of thousands of employees.

On 21 December, the Warehouse Group announced that it was in a "confident enough position" to repay its NZ$67.8 million COVID-19 wage subsidy to the Government.

From early 2021, all Warehouse stores across the country stopped selling physical media including DVDs, Blu-Rays, CDs, and Vinyl Records. In May 2021, the Warehouse Group announced that fireworks would no longer be sold at the Warehouse stores. Jewellery counters also began to close in July 2021.

Since 2023 the Warehouse has been trialling selling fresh fruit and vegetables.

In late 2023, Sanitarium stopped supplying the Warehouse with Weet-Bix due to alleged supply issues. The Warehouse asked the Commerce Commission to investigate, and Sanitarium revoked the move the following week. In March 2024 the Commission said that it was "not clear that Sanitarium breach[ed] ... the Commerce Act" and that it would not "prioritize the matter for further investigation". As a result, chief executive Grayston said he was "very disappointed".

In February 2024, the Warehouse Group sold Torpedo7 for $1 to Tahua Partners.

== Business ==
The Warehouse operates discount retail department stores selling a broad range of non-grocery and grocery products. As of January 2015, the Warehouse employed over 12,000 people in New Zealand. The Warehouse's corporate headquarters are located in North Shore, New Zealand.

The company operates from over 240 retail locations, as well as two distribution centers located in Wiri and in Rolleston, New Zealand, and 13 online stores.

In addition to its operations, it owns various brand names that are located within the stores. It has gardening facilities located in Auckland, Hamilton and in Christchurch. Along with its gardening brand Just, it also operates nearly 30 in-company brands.

The Warehouse is publicly traded on the New Zealand Stock Exchange with the security code WHS (previously TWH).

=== Criticism ===
In May 2007, the company released 13,000 balloons from Dairy Flat to mark its 25th anniversary. This sparked concerns from the Department of Conservation and other environmentalists as the balloons had been known to endanger wildlife.

In December 2009, it was announced that the Warehouse staff would be taking industrial action due to issues with staff having their hours extended to 50-hour weeks in the lead-up to Christmas and staff having to work late at night.

In December 2018, Noel Leeming was fined $200,000 for misleading consumers about their rights under the Consumer Guarantees Act (CGA) following a Commerce Commission prosecution. Noel Leeming was convicted on eight charges under the Fair Trading Act.

In March 2020, the Warehouse Group drew criticism when its directors prematurely announced that they were an essential service during the COVID-19 pandemic without consulting with the Government. The company faced a fine of NZ$500,000 if it was found to have breached the New Zealand Exchange's disclosure rules or found to have profited from a rise in its share price stemming from the announcement. The company subsequently shut down its brands for the duration of the four-week lockdown with all staff being given full paid leave.

In early June 2020, the Warehouse Group was criticised by First Union coordinator Kate Davis for allegedly not consulting employees about a plan to lay off 1,080 workers and close six stores as a result of the COVID-19 pandemic.

=== Return policy ===
The company operates a comprehensive returns policy. A "60-day money-back guarantee" policy with returns accepted for any reason is available on most products, excluding underwear, pre-recorded media, and perishable products.

=== Australian expansion ===
In 2000, the company entered the Australian retail market. It acquired the Clint's Crazy Bargains and Silly Solly's retail chains. At the time of purchase, those chains had around 117 stores.

In 2003, the company built a $33 million (AUD) distribution centre in Queensland to service the country. Later that year, the company introduced its Tui and Tolas inventory management systems from New Zealand.

As of 2005, the Australian arm was still under-performing. Sales for 2005 were at $518.8 million (AUD) compared with $567.3 million (AUD) in 2004. The Warehouse Group Limited announced in November 2005 that it had entered into a conditional agreement to sell the Warehouse Australia business to Catalyst Investment Managers and its parent PPM Capital Limited (together, Catalyst) and Castle Harlan Australian Mezzanine Partners, acting on behalf of the CHAMP I and CHAMP II funds (CHAMP) for A$92 million (NZ$99m). The new entity was known as Australian Discount Retail (ADR). As part of the transaction, the Warehouse Australia's Sydney Head Office would be sold to Investec Wentworth Specialised Property Trust. While the effective date for the transaction was due to be 27 November 2005, completion of the sale was expected in early 2006 and was subject to normal regulatory approvals.

At its formation, ADR also purchased the discount store operations of Miller's Retail, including the Go-Lo, Crazy Clark's and Chickenfeed chains. There were 335 such stores at the time of sale.

After the sale of the Australian operation, Warehouse stores were renamed Sam's Warehouse.

The operations soon had massive wall-to-wall administrations and management changes culminating in widespread closures, divestments to rivals like The Reject Shop, and mergers of chains until it was finally placed into liquidation by receivers in 2014.

=== The Warehouse Extra hypermarkets ===
In June 2006, the Warehouse Extra opened at Sylvia Park, Auckland. It was the first of a planned chain of hypermarkets, at 135,000 sq ft (12,500 sq m). In a similar fashion to the Wal-Mart Supercenters of the United States, the foodmarket department aisles are placed at a perpendicular angle to the general merchandise. It is the first store to feature an in-store bakery, pharmacy, and café, and instead of the usual tall industrial shelving, a more conventional store shelving system has been used. The store also features a lot less red than in traditional stors, but the familiar concrete floor still exists. The next branches of the Warehouse Extra" were in Whangārei and Te Rapa in Hamilton. In October 2008 the Warehouse announced that they would be closing the Warehouse Extra format with stores reverting to the more traditional style of the store coming months. There were four of the Warehouse Extra in Auckland (Albany, Manukau, Sylvia Park, and Westgate). Today, the Warehouse Extra brand is used in larger traditional stores nationwide, with many existing large stores have taken on the Warehouse Extra branding such as those in Lyall Bay (Wellington), Riccarton (Christchurch), South Dunedin and Palmerston North. Stores carrying the Warehouse Extra brand are typically larger, open later and carry a greater range than regular stores.

=== The Warehouse Local ===
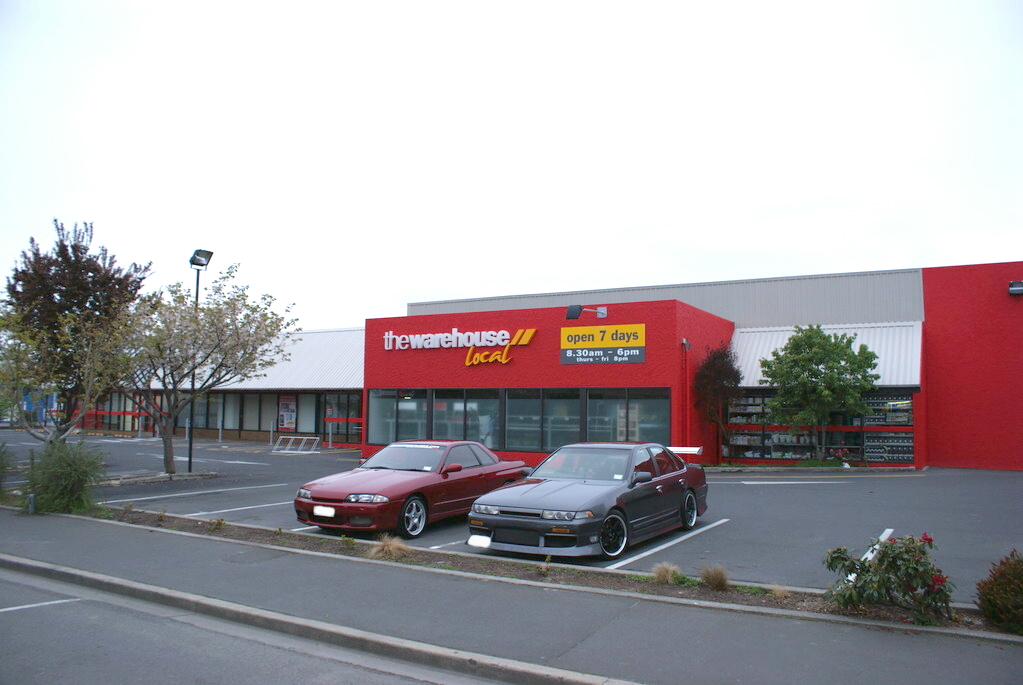
Street view of Mosgiel's Warehouse Local store

On Thursday 23 July 2009, the Warehouse Group opened the first of its smaller-concept stores, the Warehouse Local, in Mosgiel. These stores are approximately 2000 square meters in size, compared with the usual 5000 square meters seen in larger locations. These stores also have single checkout counters, doing without dedicated Service, Jewellery, and Entertainment counters which are present in most other stores. Another 3 stores were intended to be launched per year, following this concept.

While the "Local" naming is no longer used, smaller stores in Rolleston and St Lukes have opened using the smaller format.

=== Entry into e-commerce ===
In 2009, the Warehouse announced its entry into online shopping. The brand's full range of products was available online by 2012, in time for the brand's 30th birthday.

The brand's offerings were also made available on the New Zealand e-commerce platform The Market in 2019.

=== Store within a store ===
In 2017, the Warehouse Group unveiled its first "store within a store" (shortened to SWAS), with Warehouse Stationery moving into the Warehouse Auckland Airport after their lease at their previous Auckland Airport Mall premises ended.

The Warehouse SWAS stores have many similar features of typical Warehouse Stationery stores, including a range of computers, printers, office furniture, and stationery, as well as a Print & Copy Centre. The Warehouse departments, such as furniture and entertainment, merge in a SWAS environment.

There are currently 25 SWAS Warehouse Stationery Stores operating across New Zealand.

== Active subsidiaries ==
The Warehouse Group currently owns three primary brand subsidiaries.

=== The Warehouse ===
The Warehouse

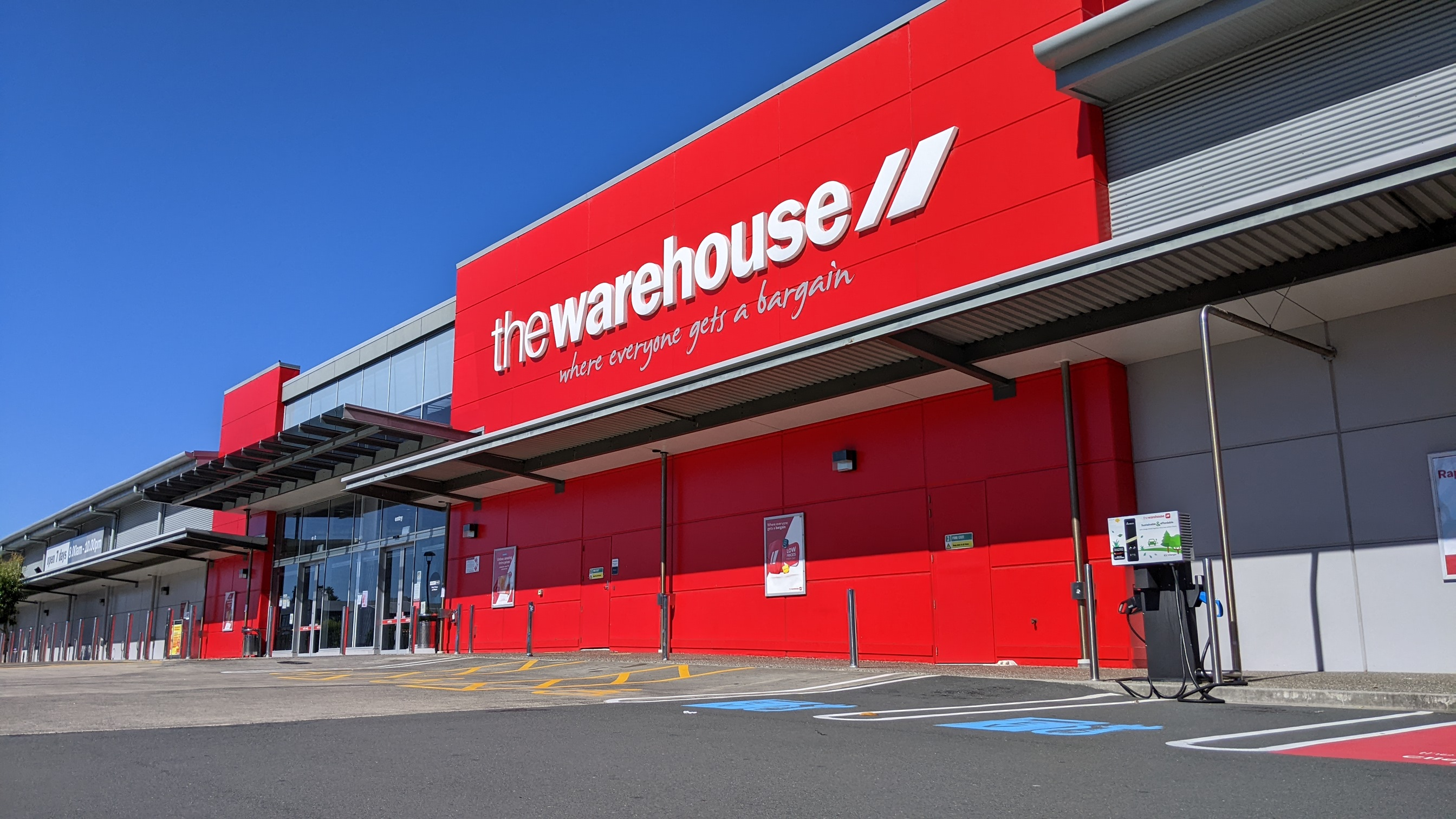
- Type: Subsidiary
- Number of locations: 89 stores (2022)
- Website: thewarehouse.co.nz

The primary and central store for the Group, founded in 1982 by Sir Stephen Tindall, is known as the Warehouse. It offers a wide range of essential items including sports equipment, gardening equipment, and furniture. Due to their branding and distinctive red-colored buildings, the Warehouse's stores are commonly referred to as "Red Sheds" within the organisation and in New Zealand. They primarily compete with Kmart in the discount department store sector, as well as with other specialised retailers such as hardware stores like Mitre 10 and Bunnings, automotive parts retailers like Repco and Supercheap Auto, electronics and homeware retailers like Farmers, Harvey Norman and JB Hi-Fi, and grocery stores like Woolworths and Foodstuffs.

=== Warehouse Stationery ===
Warehouse Stationery
- The current logo, used since 2013
- Type: Subsidiary
- Founded: October 1991; 35 years ago
- Number of locations: 68 stores, including 35 SWAS (2022)
- Parent: The Warehouse Group
- Website: warehousestationery.co.nz

Warehouse Stationery is a large store containing a variety of different products with a blue color, similar to Officeworks in Australia or OfficeMax in America. It offers a wide range of products across multiple categories, including office supplies, school supplies, fashion stationery, technology, furniture, art & craft, and ink & toner. In the books and stationery market, it competes with Paper Plus and Whitcoulls, while in the electronics sector, it faces competition from retailers such as JB Hi-Fi and Harvey Norman. In the business and stationery online space, it competes with OfficeMax.

Warehouse Stationery provides customers with a BizRewards membership, allowing them to shop and collect rewards points at both the Warehouse and Warehouse Stationery stores nationwide, as well as online. Additionally, by choosing a Credit Account membership, customers can collect points in-store at Noel Leeming.

The first Warehouse Stationery branch opened in 1991, and the company has since grown from 8 stores in 1995 to 70 stores spanning from Kerikeri to Invercargill as of 2019.

=== Noel Leeming ===
Noel Leeming is a retail electronics chain that specialises in selling a wide range of products, including computers, household appliances, TVs, and audio equipment. With 71 stores, including 20 in Auckland, Noel Leeming offers a larger selection of higher-value electronic goods compared to other chains under the Warehouse Group.

In addition to its retail operations, Noel Leeming operates Tech Solutions, a service that provides support, installation, and learning assistance for technology users. This service caters to both in-store and in-home customers, offering comprehensive electronics and whiteware support.

== Previous subsidiaries ==
=== The Warehouse Group Financial Services Ltd ===
The Warehouse Group Financial Services Limited was a joint venture that was formed in 2001 following the joint acquisition of Diners Club New Zealand by the Warehouse Group and Westpac Banking Corporation.

The Warehouse Group Financial Services Limited provides consumer credit cards and insurance through the Warehouse brand and distribution channels. In the 2014 Annual Report, it is stated that The Group holds a 49% minority share in this financial arm of TW Group with Westpac holding a 51% majority share.

On 1 October 2015 TW Group announced the acquisition of the remaining 51% of TW Group Financial Services from Westpac. The acquisition cost $7.3 million (NZD). Later in the release TW Group also announce their plans to expand the unit not by acquisition but by internal expansion.

In July 2017, less than two years following the acquisition from Westpac, the Warehouse Group announced the sale of the financial services division. The division had been slow to return a profit and returned a bigger loss then expected. The division was sold to FinanceNow, a division of SBS Bank.

=== Bond and Bond ===
Bond & Bond (stylised as Bond+Bond) was a retail electronics store founded by Enoch Bond, in Silverdale, Auckland in 1875. The store opened its first home appliance branch in Auckland in 1894. It was previously a subsidiary of the Noel Leeming Group before the group's acquisition by the Warehouse Group in 2012.

The chain had 31 stores in 2008. It had 24 stores in early 2013, including ten in Auckland.

In 2013, Bond & Bond was merged into Noel Leeming as part of a decision to provide a clear focus on the flagship Noel Leeming brand. Bond & Bond remained as an online clearance website until its closure in 2014.

=== R&R Sport ===
R&R Sport was an independent outdoor chain established in Dunedin Central in 1981. By 2014, it had 10 stores, including two in Auckland.

In 2014, the Warehouse Group took over the chain and rebranded its stores as Torpedo 7.

=== Torpedo7 ===
Torpedo7 was once a multi-channel subsidiary of the Warehouse Group that owns and operates several online stores, including Torpedo7 (a retailer of sports and outdoor equipment), 1-day.co.nz (an online daily deals site), and Number One Fitness (which sells exercise equipment).

Founded in 2004 by mountain bike enthusiast Luke Howard-Willis and his father, Guy Howard-Willis, the Warehouse Group purchased a 51% stake in the company for NZ$33 million. In October 2014, seven R&R Sport stores, which were previously acquired by the Warehouse Group in December 2013, were rebranded as Torpedo7. This expansion included the addition of two new physical stores, marking Torpedo7's entry into the retail of physical stores. In February 2024 the Warehouse Group sold Torpedo7 for $1 to Tahua Partners.

=== TheMarket ===
TheMarket
- Headquarters: Auckland, NZ
- Parent: The Warehouse Group
- Website: themarket.com/nz

TheMarket is an online shopping platform that operates as an online marketplace, offering products from over 250 retailers and brands worldwide. Similar to Amazon, TheMarket provides a wide range of items for purchase. The platform is headquartered in Newmarket, Auckland, and is part of the Warehouse Group's digital transformation strategy, which began in February 2017. The initiative aimed to invest in the digital future of retail.

Under the leadership of Chief Executive Justus Wilde, a global online retail expert, TheMarket team started working on the project in early 2018. With a startup mindset, they successfully launched the mobile-first platform on 1 August 2019 after a beta testing period in July. TheMarket collaborated with various retailers and brands, establishing partnerships to offer a diverse product selection.

TheMarket primarily operates using a drop-shipping business model. This means that third-party business-to-consumer (B2C) retailers list their branded products on the platform, and orders are dispatched directly by the retailers themselves. Although TheMarket holds some inventory, its main focus is on facilitating transactions between customers and retailers.

Since its launch, TheMarket has steadily grown its retailer base. Starting with 100+ retailers in August 2019, it expanded to 200+ retailers by November 2019. The platform aims to reach 400+ retailers by early 2020. In November 2019, TheMarket introduced its subscription program called TheMarket Club, which offers benefits such as free shipping, streaming services, and other features inspired by global giant Amazon.

To enhance convenience for customers, TheMarket utilises an organised network of "MarketPoint" sites within the Warehouse Group's existing 242 physical locations across New Zealand. These MarketPoint sites can be found in the Warehouse, Warehouse Stationery, Noel Leeming, and Torpedo7 stores. Additionally, Rural MarketPoint sites are operated by FarmSource in partnership with Fonterra. Currently, there are 72 MarketPoint sites available, and plans are in place to expand to 300 nationwide. MarketPoint sites allow customers to collect and return goods purchased from TheMarket, similar to services offered by Amazon Hub or ASOS.com’s Click and Collect.

In March 2024 the Warehouse said that it had intentions to either sell or close TheMarket by the end of the year.

== Financial results ==
The Warehouse went public in 1995. Since then the stock has climbed from $1.29 to $5.54 in 2005 then to $2.605 as of 8 January 2015. During 2005, the stock dropped dramatically due to worse than expected results from the Australian operation.

In the financial year ended September 2015, the Warehouse Group reported a revenue of NZ$2.77 billion (up 4.6% on the previous financial year) and profits of NZ$57.1 million (down nearly 6% on the last financial year). Online sales made up NZ$150 million of their revenue – a rise of nearly 800% from just NZ$18.8 million in 2011, though still barely 0.56% of their total sales. While the Warehouse and Warehouse Stationery recorded strong profit growth, the Noel Leeming electronics store division reported a drop in profit of 43% (partly due to one-off rebranding costs). The Torpedo7 Group (including Torpedo7, R&R Fitness, Shotgun Supplements and No.1 Fitness) recorded a profit just above break-even, hit by change and rebranding costs. Meanwhile, the Warehouse Financial Services division recorded a $1.9 million loss, "in line with expectations".
