= The Reject Shop =

Australian discount variety store chain

Dollarama Australia Pty Ltd
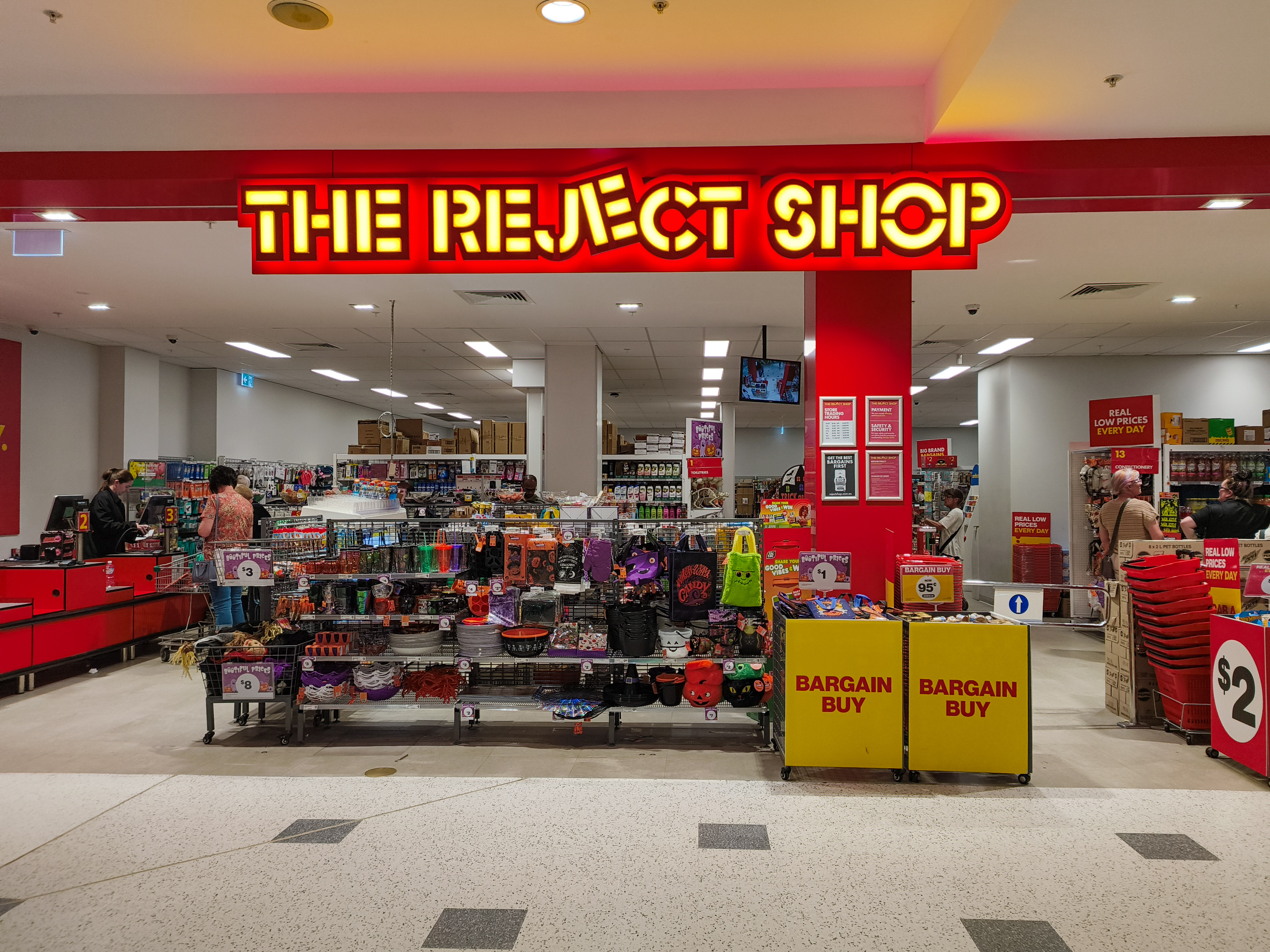
- The Reject Shop store in Westfield Whitford City
- Formerly: The Reject Shop Limited (1979–2026)
- Type: Subsidiary
- Industry: Retail
- Founded: 1979; 47 years ago
- Founder: Ron Hall; John Shuster
- Headquarters: Kensington, Victoria, Australia
- Number of locations: 401 stores (2025)
- Area served: Australia
- Key people: Clinton Cahn (Chief Executive Officer)
- Products: Discount variety goods
- Revenue: A$852 million (2024)
- Net income: A$14 million (2024)
- Number of employees: 5,000 (2024)
- Parent: Dollarama (2025–present)
- Website: Official website

Dollarama Austalia Pty Ltd (doing business as The Reject Shop until the conversion to Dollarama is complete by the end of 2027) is an Australian discount variety store chain selling a range of household and consumer goods including food, snacks, party supplies, cleaning products, kitchenware and seasonal items. The company operates more than 400 stores across Australia and is headquartered in Kensington, Victoria.

Founded in 1979, The Reject Shop grew to become one of Australia's largest discount retail chains. The company employs over 5,000 staff nationwide.

The retailer expanded in several Australian states and took over locations previously operated by other chains, including some stores formerly operated by Chickenfeed in Tasmania following the closure of Retail Adventures.

In 2025, Canadian discount retailer Dollarama acquired The Reject Shop and delisted the company from the Australian Securities Exchange. Following the acquisition, Dollarama announced plans to transform the business and rebrand stores under the Dollarama brand.

== History ==
The first store was opened in South Yarra, Melbourne by founders Ron Hall and John Shuster in 1981. This shop sold seconds and discontinued lines, hence The Reject Shop name.

In 1994, the chain became majority owned by Macquarie Bank. It was floated on the Australian Securities Exchange in June 2004. The float was successful, with the company tripling in size two years after going public.

Former Chief Executive Barry Saunders, recruited to the company in 2000 by Macquarie Bank, retired in 2007. He was replaced in May 2007 by Gerry Masters, a former Coles Group executive, after 33 years with his former employer.

On 11 September 2009, it was announced that Gerry Masters had resigned his position as managing director and would be replaced by Chris Bryce, the chief financial officer, effective 14 September 2009.

Despite the strong growth experienced by the company in the years following 2004, a profit warning in December 2010 resulted in a sharp drop in the share price. The company was also affected by the Queensland Floods of 2010, with the company's Ipswich Distribution Centre being flooded. The warehouse became operational once again on 28 August 2011. A similar profit warning in June 2014 resulted in another share drop of 50%, making them one of the top worst performing shares in 2014.

In 2013, the company commenced an aggressive growth plan, following the closure of a number of Retail Adventures stores. The company passed the 300 store milestone in October 2013.

On 8 July 2014, The Reject Shop announced the appointment of Ross Sudano (formerly of Little World Beverages) as chief executive officer. His appointment followed the departure of Chris Bryce in June 2014, after leading a significant growth phase of the business.

In January 2020, the company announced Andre Reich as chief executive officer. In September 2020, The Reject Shop announced a partnership with British supermarket chain Tesco. In October they launched a lowest price guarantee In November 2020, The Reject Shop launched a partnership with DoorDash.

=== Dollarama acquisition ===
In March 2025, the board accepted a $259 million takeover offer from Dollarama, a Canadian discount retailer. The investor presentation said it will deliver a “dollarama shopping experience” with a new store layout, design and merchandising experience. The acquisition was completed in July 2025 and the company was removed from the ASX. It was confirmed in August 2025 that The Reject Shop stores would be rebadged as Dollarama.

At least one media commentator expressed concerns about the acquisition and planned rebranding describing it as an “eerily similar path” to that of Retail Adventures’ ill-fated acquisition of Australian Discount Retail – the parent company of Crazy Clark's, Go-Lo, Chickenfeed (Retail Chain) and Sam's Warehouse.

In January 2026, the company's entity name changed from The Reject Shop Limited to Dollarama Australia Pty Ltd.

In March 2026, Dollarama president and chief executive Neil Rossy told investors that he was confident that with an expanded footprint, rebranded Dollarama Australia stores can dominate Australia’s multi-billion dollar discount and general merchandise space, stating that: “while this is a four-year project, once you’ve established a low-cost retail platform in Australia, with by that point, over 500-600 stores, we feel very confident that being the 800-pound gorilla in the market will play very well for our shareholders.”

By March 2025, a “handful” of renovated Reject Shop stores had adopted Dollarama’s in-store layout and fixtures. However, they will continue to operate under the legacy Reject Shop banner until the assortment of new Dollarama stock increases. As of March 2026, Dollarama had not yet decided it would replicate the “nothing over $5” pledge it currently has in its Canadian stores.

== See also ==
- Homeart
- Target Australia
- Best & Less
