= Chickenfeed (retail chain) =

Former Australian chain of discount variety stores

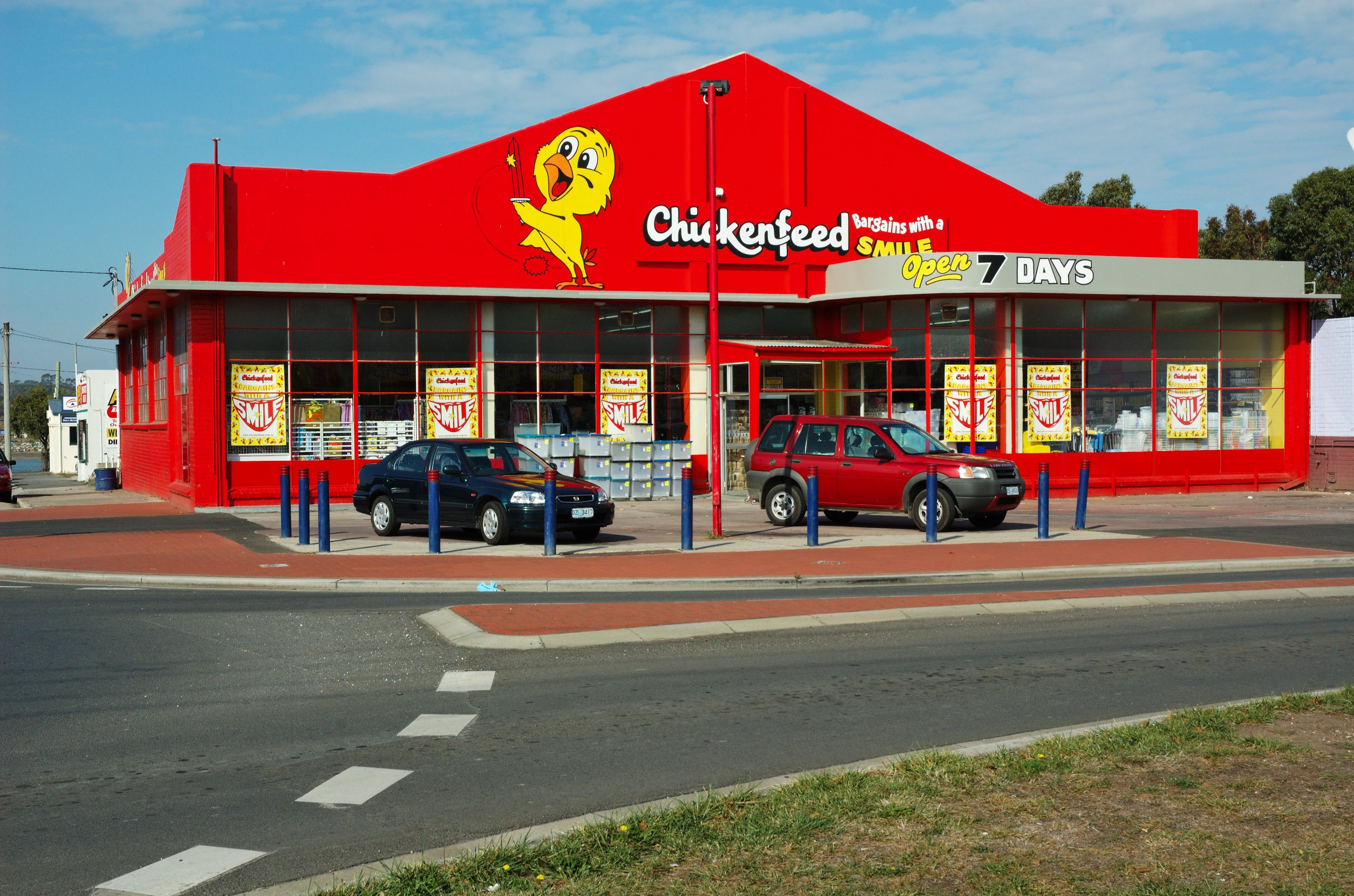
- Chickenfeed in George Town in 2007
- Type: Discount store chain
- Industry: Retail
- Founded: 1990; 36 years ago
- Defunct: 2013; 13 years ago
- Fate: Collapsed
- Headquarters: Australia
- Owner: Jan Cameron
- Website: chickenfeed.com.au at the Wayback Machine (archived 9 April 2013)

Chickenfeed was a chain of discount retail stores in Australia, founded in 1990 in Tasmania by the prominent Sypkes family. At its height it had roughly 44 stores in Tasmania, Victoria and New South Wales. It was taken over by Miller's Retail Ltd. in 2001. After further changes of ownership, the brand was discontinued after a parent company went into receivership, and the final stores were closed in 2013.

== History ==
The company was founded by Rudie and Peter Sypkes in 1990, and continued to expand until it became Tasmania's only discount retail store chain, and Rudie and Peter Sypkes continued to own Chickenfeed until 2001.

In May 2001, they sold the business to Miller's Retail Ltd. for $35 million in cash and Miller's shares. Rudie Sypkes continued to run the chain, intending to stay for at least two years.

It became part of Australian Discount Retail in 2005. In 2009 Australian millionaire Jan Cameron purchased Australian Discount Retail, and ownership changed to Retail Adventures Pty Ltd. Following the change of ownership, it was announced that all Go-Lo, Crazy Clark's and Sam's Warehouse stores would be rebranded Chickenfeed over the next five years. Soon after it was announced that nine new Chickenfeed stores were to be opened in Victoria to test the mainland market. The last of these was opened in August, and nearly 20 stores were eventually opened across the mainland.

Store closure began in October 2012 with up to 20 Chickenfeed stores in Tasmania closed or closure was announced without explanation, including a Launceston (Prospect Vale) store which was forcibly reclaimed by security guards of the company which owned the complex it was situated in, after the company did not pay its rent, as well as a similar situation in its store in Centrepoint Shopping Centre, Hobart.

On 27 October 2012, parent company Retail Adventures was placed in administration. Owner Jan Cameron continued to operate the profitable stores under a licence from the administrators. The Chickenfeed rebranding has ceased, with the Chickenfeed brand to disappear altogether. Any remaining profitable stores after a restructure were rebranded as "Crazy Clark's" or "Sam's Warehouse".

During the period of administration, concern had been expressed by company staff that one of the primary reasons behind the changes and eventual closure of stores was due to the high rent imposed on the stores by the landlords, the Sypkes family. The Sypkes family hold a 50% share in the Shiploads discount chain, and a number of Shiploads discount stores have opened in locations that previously held Chickenfeed stores.

All stores were closed on 20 May 2013, excluding the Southern Tasmania Clearance Centre which was rebranded to Sam's Warehouse in mid October 2013.

== Trivia ==
Over its history, Chickenfeed went under a number of taglines, most notably "Don't you love 'em", and "Bargains with a SMILE". They also ran a number of promotional campaigns, including "The WOW Zone" and the Purple Chicken Club, which allowed you to a number of benefits, including discounts on certain items, and exclusive items such as money tins, collectable badges and t-shirts.

Chickenfeed's jingle, officially titled "A Little Goes a Long Long Way" went over a few revisions over its history. Throughout its early days, it contained a similarity to "The Chicken Dance", a famous American party song. The jingle later went on to receive a new, rock styled theme, which saw the change from the aforementioned taglines "Don't you love 'em" to "Bargains with a SMILE". It also saw the change from real life advertising, to computer assisted design.

Chickenfeed carried a mascot named Cheepa, who was originally a live action mascot costume, but was later revamped and changed into a computer model, who appeared in a variety of Chickenfeed's ads in the years leading up to its shutdown. Cheepa also appeared in a variety of additional promotional and entertainment pieces, notably the "Chookalogue" and "Super Cheep", a flash game which had the player flying over houses as Cheepa, trying to get Chookalogues to land in the nearby mailboxes.
