= Shiploads =

Tasmanian retail chain

- Shiploads logo with the slogan "How much have you saved?"
- Type: Discount store chain
- Industry: Retail
- Founded: 2013; 13 years ago
- Number of locations: 12
- Area served: Tasmania
- Owner: Sypkes family
- Website: www.shiploads.com.au

Shiploads is a chain of discount retail stores in Tasmania, Australia, that replaced Chickenfeeds discount stores since closure in the 2010s. It was founded in 2013 which moved in previous Chickenfeed stores across Tasmania. It currently roughly has up to 12 stores operating in Tasmania.

== History ==
In 2010, Shiploads opened its first store in Cambridge in the Cambridge Homemaker complex. Throughout the 2010s, a number of Shiploads discount stores have opened in locations that previously held Chickenfeed stores and rebranded from Chickenfeed to Shiploads which sometime around 2014 to 2017, Shiploads moved in Burnie in the Woolworths Supermarket (previously Roelf Vos), same around the Devonport region, the Launceston region like Kings Meadows, the Derwent Valley region, and the Hobart region.

In 2022, the Sandy Bay Shiploads store closed on Christmas Eve due to the property owner announced it will be redeveloping the site. It was later on turned into a Dan Murphy's bottle shop.

== Marketing ==
Shiploads mascot

Shiploads uses an anthropomorphic orange boat with shipping containers on the back of it, eyes and a mouth.

Shiploads uses the slogan "How much have you saved?" with a mark under the word "saved" which is commonly used in their advertisements and catalogues.
