= Avenue (store) =

American fashion chain

Avenue Stores, LLC
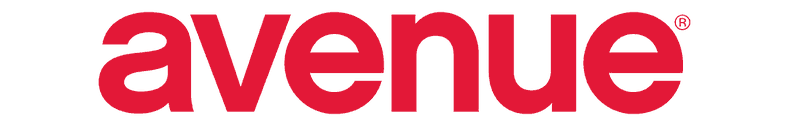
- Type: Private
- Industry: Retail
- Founded: 1987; 39 years ago (as The Avenue)
- Defunct: 2019 (stores)
- Fate: Bankruptcy
- Headquarters: Rochelle Park, New Jersey, U.S.
- Number of locations: 222 (33 states) (2019)
- Key people: Mark Walsh (CEO)
- Products: Clothing, footwear, jewelry
- Revenue: ▲US$399.25.1 million (2006)
- Operating income: ▲US$12.982 million (2006)
- Net income: ▲US$10.48 million (2006)
- Owner: Versa Capital Management
- Website: www.avenue.com

Avenue Stores LLC was a specialty retailer in the United States offering plus-size clothing to women who wear larger-size clothing. The company serves a target audience of women aged between 25 and 55 years of age, wearing apparel of size 14 or larger, and also sells shoes and accessories. The group operated 222 stores in 33 states in 2019, all under the name The Avenue.

Avenue Stores LLC was headquartered in New Rochelle, New Jersey and went through a series of parent companies, with Versa Capital Management, a private equity firm overseeing its final bankruptcy. It also operated the women fashion brands Loralette and Cloudwalkers.

Avenue closed all of its stores by 2019, remaining only as an online retail operation.

== History ==
In 1983, Avenue clothing stores began when Limited Brands combined their Lerner Woman and Sizes Unlimited brands. The new business, under the auspecies of United Retail Group, was based in New Rochelle, New Jersey. Its IPO took place in 1992. In 2005, and 2006, Avenue was showing sales growth.

The company was acquired by the now-defunct Redcats USA in 2007, with their parent company Kerig, a French fashion group. When Avenue went bankrupt in 2012, it was acquired by Philadelphia-based private equity firm Versa Capital Management.

Early in 2012, United Retail Group, Inc., Avenue's parent company, filed for Chapter 11 bankruptcy and was acquired by Versa Capital Management. At the time, many of the Avenue stores remained open, as well as some distribution centers.

Chrissy Metz of This Is Us said she wore clothing from Avenue, and appeared at her publicized 36th birthday in a faux leather jacket from the store. In addition, the brand put out a nationwide call for customers to try-out to be Avenue clothing plus-size models.

In May 2018, Mark Walsh was appointed CEO of Avenue, succeeding to Liz Williams.

On August 9, 2019, Avenue Stores again filed for Chapter 11 bankruptcy. The case was filed in Delaware as case number 19-11842. According to an affidavit filed by David Rhoads, the company's President and Chief Financial Officer, the company struggled to compete. It planned to use the bankruptcy process to sell its e-commerce business and wind down its physical stores. The e-commerce business maintains the domains: avenue.com and loralette.com. SB360 Capital Partners, LLC has been identified as the stalking horse bidder.

In October 2019, the e-commerce assets were sold to Australian retailer City Chic Collective. Avenue was purchased by FullBeauty Brands in June 2024 from City Chic.
