= Woman Within =

Woman Within may refer to:

- A clothing line produced by the company FullBeauty Brands
- The Woman Within, the autobiography of Ellen Glasgow
- Woman Within, a sister organization to ManKind Project
