= Discount Superstores Group =

- Type: Privately held company
- Industry: Retail
- Founded: 2013; 13 years ago
- Defunct: 2014; 12 years ago
- Fate: Receivership; follows other administrations
- Headquarters: North Ryde, New South Wales, Australia
- Number of locations: 143 stores
- Owner: Jan Cameron
- Subsidiaries: Sam's Warehouse, Crazy Clark's.
- Website: www.retailadventures.com.au

DSG Holdings Australia Pty Ltd, trading as Discount Superstores Group was a discount variety retailer in Australia, formed in 2013 following the liquidation of former company Retail Adventures. It owned the Sam's Warehouse and Crazy Clark's brands, operating 143 stores. It is owned by Australian-New Zealand businesswoman Jan Cameron. It was announced on 1 July 2014 that the chain has entered receivership for the fourth time in 8 years.

== History ==
Australian Discount Retail was formed in 2005 after the sale of the discount division of Miller's Retail (now known as City Chic Collective, with assets as Mosaic Brands) and the sale of The Warehouse Australia by The Warehouse Group New Zealand to private equity firms Catalyst and CHAMP. Catalyst and CHAMP reportedly paid A$200 million which was funded by NAB Capital, ANZ and BOS International. The combined entity was Australia's leading discount variety retailer with revenues nearing $1 billion and a store presence in every state and territory in the country.

The company traded under the household names Go-Lo /Crazy Clark's (275 stores), Chickenfeed (39 stores), and Sam's Warehouse (99 stores). In 2008 the company rebranded all The Warehouse stores as Sam's Warehouse as a condition of sale from The Warehouse New Zealand.

The main competitors of Australian Discount Retail included Kmart, Homeart and The Reject Shop.

On 20 January 2009 the Board of Australian Discount Retail has placed the company in voluntary administration. Staff were assured their entitlements are safe, but the future of their employment would not be known for months as a buyer was sought for the business. The size and scale of ADR makes this the biggest retail collapse Australian business in over five years.

On 23 March 2009 it was announced that the company had been sold to Retail Adventures Pty Ltd, a company owned by Australian millionaire Jan Cameron, the former owner of Kathmandu, for an undisclosed sum. The sale guaranteed the 2,500 permanent and 7,500 casual jobs under ADR.

On 27 October 2012, Retail Adventures Pty Ltd was placed into administration. Owner Jan Cameron was granted license to operate the viable section of the business. 950 staff were expected to lose their jobs, while 5000 full-time staff at 238 stores were to remain. The only brands that survived were Crazy Clark's and Sam's Warehouse; Chickenfeed shut down its stores across Tasmania and Victoria, with the remaining 6 stores sold to The Reject Shop in May 2013.

In March 2013, Jan Cameron purchased the remaining viable sections of the business from the administrators for $59 million AUD following extensive restructuring, forming a new company DSG Holdings Australia Pty Ltd which traded under the name the Discount Superstores Group.

== Project Simplify ==
Project Simplify was a long-term strategic plan initiated by Jan Cameron and David Young since the acquisition of ADR in 2009. Young and his colleagues believed that the business was too complicated, and were planning a number of changes to be carried out by 2013.

=== Stocking strategy ===
Retail Adventures focuses on the Pareto principle, rather than strategies like sales per square metre and department performance. David Young explains "That core range is built on the 80-20 principle: 20 percent of our range will give us 80 percent of our business." In this way, the company focuses on their core merchandise range and seasonal demand is what drives the rest of the business platform. This in turn means that the specific stock will vary around the country, due to each individual store's ability to be flexible in promotion, planning and stock display.

=== Chickenfeed brand ===
Each of the four subsidiaries of Retail Adventures entered the acquisition with individual strategies and slogans. Retail Adventures had plans to merge all of their counterparts into Chickenfeed, with the slogan "Bargains with a Smile". Chickenfeed retailers on average outperformed all the other markets owned by Retail Adventures by at least 30% per square metre. Chickenfeed utilized catalogue advertising approximately 25% less than its counterparts, and used television advertisements as their main marketing venture, working with 4–5 different product commercials. The success seen from these community strategies that Chickenfeed had utilized is what Retail Adventures planned to use for each of its brands. However, considering the company is now in administration (see Retail Adventures#Administration), the company will instead be rebranding all Chickenfeed stores as Crazy Clark's.

=== Employee retention ===
The retail industry generally suffers from a high staff turnover rate. As part of "Project Simplify", Retail Adventures is beginning to offer training, development programs and potential career development to its employees. Employment opportunities which open up within the company are usually notified to the current staff through emails and company bulletins to encourage them to move up while staying within the company.

=== Supply chain ===
As part of "Project Simplify", Retail Adventures plans to utilize its unused physical space. The company is looking to either add 150 Chickenfeed stores to the brand, or become a third-party logistics provider. Retail Adventures takes advantage of parallel importing as a way to help keep overall costs down because of the lack of trading complexities. Whilst maintaining currently buying techniques, the company is in the process of upgrading its technologies to better manage aspects such as allocation, forecasting and replenishment of its merchandise.

== Administration ==
In October 2012, it was announced the company was going into voluntary administration and that most Go-Lo and Chickenfeed will be rebranded as Crazy Clark's. Earlier in October, news outlets had reported that Retail Adventures owed landlords thousands of dollars in unpaid rent.

The move to administration was not unexpected - in late 2012 Retail Adventures had begun closing several stores across Tasmania, Queensland and Victoria, including almost 20 Chickenfeed stores. Some of these closures were forced, after Chickenfeed stores in Launceston and Hobart were reclaimed by landlords because of unpaid rent. However, prior to rebranding occurring, it was announced that all Tasmanian Chickenfeed stores would close.

The administrators allowed Discount Superstores Holdings Pty Ltd to enter into a license agreement to run the majority of the stores until an agreement between the administrators, the business and its creditors finalised the debt that Retail Adventures owed. Discount Superstores Group, ran by Jan Cameron, purchased the entire remaining assets of Crazy Clark's and Sam's Warehouse for $59 million AUD in February 2013. In July 2014, it was announced Discount Superstores Group had also collapsed, entering receivership.

== See also ==
- Big W
- Homeart
- Target Australia
