= Go-Lo =

Former Australian discount chain

- Company type: Discount retail
- Defunct: 2012; 14 years ago
- Fate: Closure
- Headquarters: Australia
- Owner: Jan Cameron
- Number of employees: 5,000
- Parent: DSG Holdings Aust Pty Ltd (Discount Superstores Group)
- Website: golo.com.au

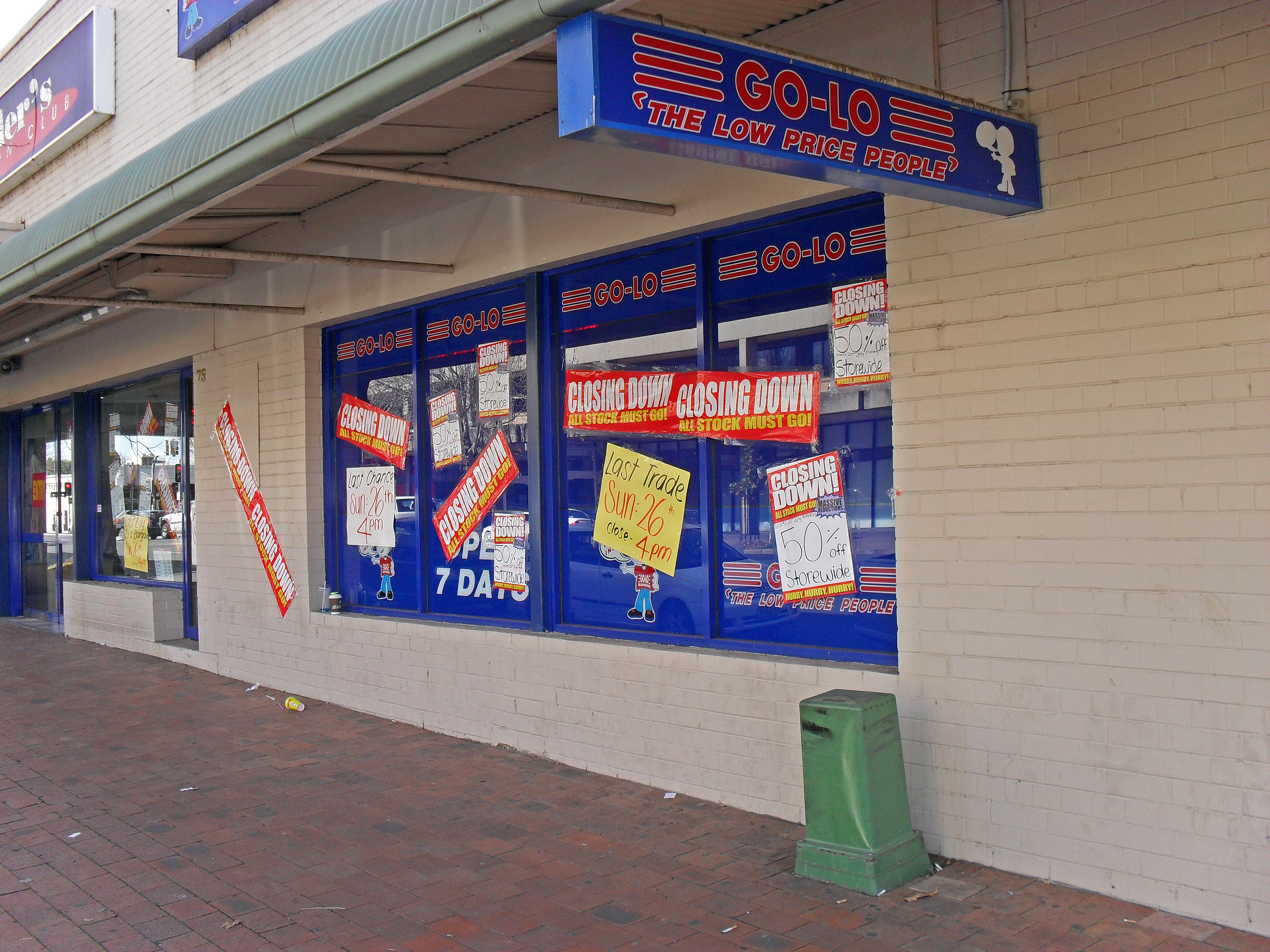
A Go-Lo store closing down in Wagga Wagga, New South Wales

Go-Lo was a chain of Australian discount variety stores with hundreds of stores throughout Australia. It was part of the largest discount retailer group in Australia. It was owned by Jan Cameron's Retail Adventures along with Sam's Warehouse, Crazy Clark's and Chickenfeed stores.

The company was sold by Miller's Retail to Australian discount retail in 2005. The chain's parent company, Australian Discount Retail, went into receivership in January 2009 after owing $201 million to creditors. Recently the company and the other three chains of stores owned by Australian Discount Retail have been bought by Jan Cameron under the company name Retail Adventures.

Retail Adventures previously announced that they will be abandoning the "Go-Lo" brand name. Over the next five years, all stores owned by Retail Adventures were to be re-branded and refitted as "Chickenfeed" based on the company's Tasmanian chain of discount stores.

However, on 27 October 2012, parent company Retail Adventures Pty Ltd went into administration. Owner Jan Cameron continued to operate the business with a licence from the administrators. The Chickenfeed rebranding ceased, and any profitable Go-Lo stores were rebranded as Crazy Clark's.

== See also ==
- Australian Discount Retail
- Homeart
