= Rudie Sypkes =

Australian businessman (1950–2008)

- Born: Rudie Sypkes; 22 May 1950; Tasmania, Australia
- Died: 8 February 2008 (aged 57); Tasmania, Australia
- Occupation: Retail entrepreneur
- Known for: founding retail chain Chickenfeed
- Family: Engel Sypkes (father)

Rudie Sypkes (22 May 1950 – 8 February 2008) was an Australian businessman from Tasmania. Sypkes was the co-founder of the Chickenfeed retail chain.

== Biography ==
Sypkes was born in Tasmania to immigrant parents from the Netherlands. He began his business career by helping his father, Engel, found the Purity supermarket chain. Sypkes later founded, with his brother, Peter launched the Chickenfeed Bargain Stores, a chain of discount retail stores located throughout Tasmania. They sold the Chickenfeed chain in 2001 for an estimated $35 million Australian dollars. Sypkes often quietly contributed to philanthropic causes throughout Tasmania using his personal fortune.

Sypkes revealed in July 2007 that he had been diagnosed with idiopathic pulmonary fibrosis and donated A$600,000 towards research into respiratory disease. Sypkes died suddenly and unexpectedly at a hospital in Tasmania on 8 February 2008. He had been on a waiting list for a lung transplant for nine months. He was survived by his wife and three children.
