= City Chic Collective =

Australian fashion company

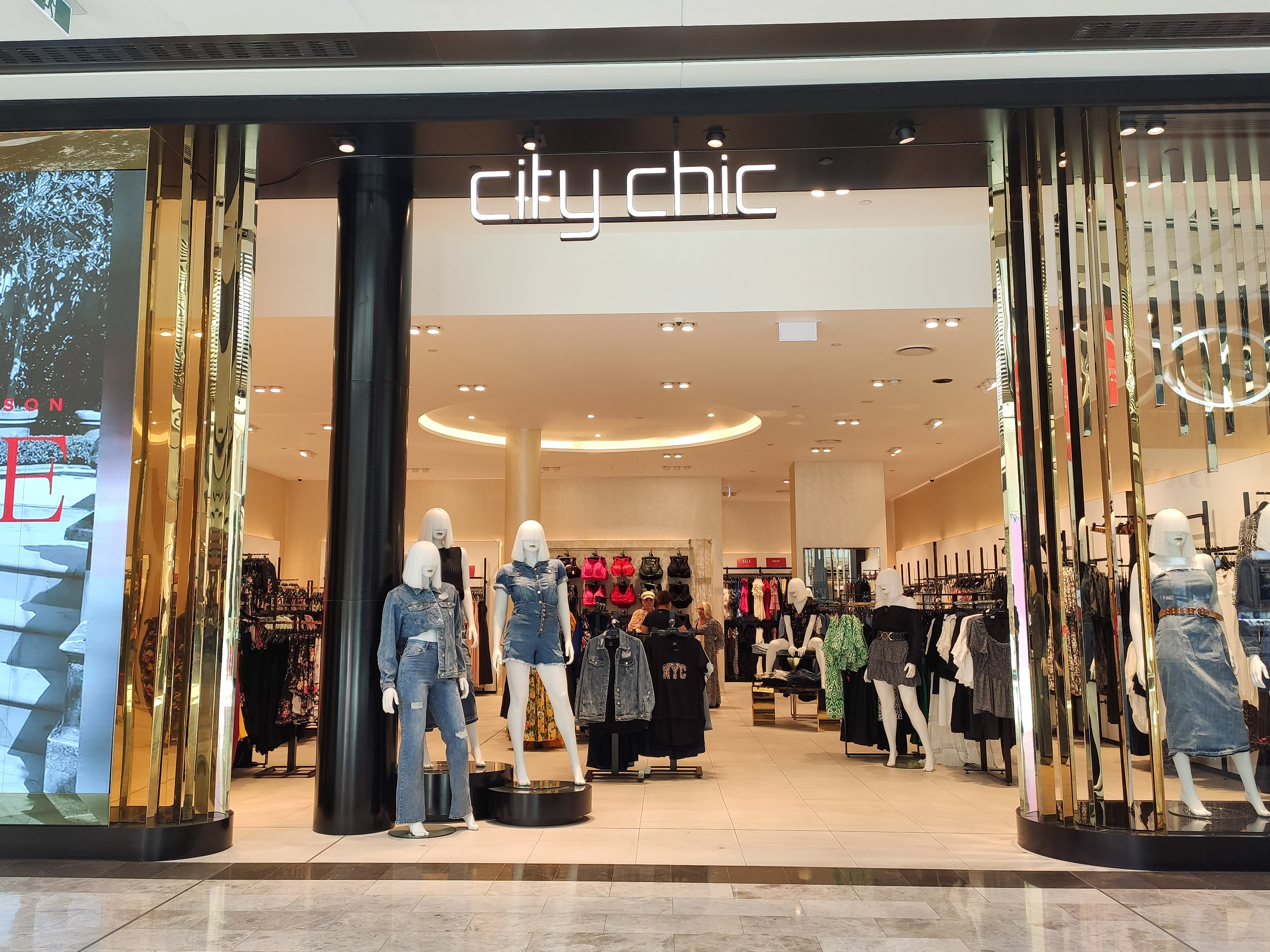
- City Chic store in Westfield Carousel
- Formerly: Miller's Retail; Specialty Fashion Group
- Type: Public
- Traded as: ASX: CCX
- Industry: Clothing
- Founded: 1992; 34 years ago
- Founder: Gary Perlstein; Ian Miller
- Headquarters: Alexandria, New South Wales, Australia
- Number of locations: 90 stores (2024)
- Revenue: ▲$148 million (2019)
- Net income: ▼$25 million (2019)
- Website: www.citychiccollective.com.au

City Chic Collective (CCC), founded as Miller's Retail in 1992, and rebranded in December 2006 to Specialty Fashion Group, is an Australian retail clothing company. It is headquartered in the Sydney suburb of Alexandria. As of January 2024, the company operates 90 stores in Australia and New Zealand, and a global online store. City Chic stores specialise in plus-sized women's clothing.

It was previously home to several holdings after an expansion in the 1990s. But in 2005 it sold its troubled discount division after making massive losses in the company and a price war in the division — the division then lasted until 2014. Then in July 2018, Millers and almost its entire portfolio was sold to Mosaic Brands (Noni B Limited) to raise much needed cash and streamline the company, leaving just City Chic in the original group — but in 2024 Mosaic went into receivership and failed to find a buyer, closing all 5 chains. Meanwhile, in 2024, the City Chic Collective left its stint in the EMEA market to raise $25 million.

== History ==
=== Miller's Retail (1992–2006) ===
Logo of Miller's Retail

Miller's Retail Ltd was an Australian company that distributed women's apparel and accessories and was one of the country's largest retailers. It was founded by Gary Perlstein and Ian Miller in 1992. It was listed on the Australian Securities Exchange in May 1998. It had a market capitalisation of $360 million, as of March 2006.

The company grew in part through acquisitions, including the Katies womenswear chain from Coles Myer (1999), and Crazy Clark's and Go-Lo stores in 2000.

Its sales for the year ending 30 June 2005 were $1.12 billion, with a net loss after tax of $103.4 million. This substantial loss was an unusual event for Miller's Retail and reflected considerable financial restructuring, including the revaluation of its businesses in Discount Variety. At the same time, the company told the market it had excessive inventory levels and pledged to address that, as well as to review buying practices in the future to avoid similar errors.

In its Apparel Division, Miller's Retail traded under the brands Miller's Fashion Club, Katies, Crossroads and 1626, which all sell women's clothing, with a total of over 700 stores. In November 2005, it sold its Discount Variety Division, which owned Go-Lo, Crazy Clark's, Look Sharp Concepts and Chickenfeed, which had a total of 335 stores at the time of the sale. Miller's Retail sold its interest in the discount variety businesses after a price war with competitors had a major impact on the profits of the division. Private equity investor Catalyst Investment Manager and CHAMP acquired the group, the new entity being called Australian Discount Retail. The company would later go into wall-to-wall administration, liquidation in 2013 then receivership in 2014.

Millers Retail's core business was the Miller's Fashion Club, a club or loyalty program, which had more than 2.8 million members across Australia and New Zealand.

The company's co-founder, Ian Miller, left the Managing Director's position in 2003, although continued for a time as Managing Director of Apparel Division and remained an executive director of the company.

=== Specialty Fashion Group (2006–2018) ===
In December 2006, Miller's Retail Ltd was renamed to Specialty Fashion Group. That month, the company also acquired Chain Reaction for $4 million. At the time, it had 42 stores trading under the Chain Reaction, Big Advantage, Big City Chic and Girl Mania names. Specialty Fashion Group retained Big City Chic's 21 stores and rebranded the others to Specialty Fashion Group brands.

In November 2013, Specialty Fashion Group acquired the Rivers chain for $5 million.

In March 2018, Specialty Fashion Group acquired the Maggie T brand which had gone into administration at the start of the year. The brand was relaunched through Millers.

In July 2018, citing massive losses and potential in the City Chic division, the company sold five of its brands; Autograph, Crossroads, Katies, Millers and Rivers, to Noni B (later renamed to Mosaic Brands) leaving only one brand, City Chic, in its portfolio. The remaining operations were rebranded City Chic Collective in November 2018.

Mosaic brands would go on shut down Autograph and Crossroads and collapse into receivership and voluntary administration in late 2024 following financial, management and legal turmoil, then go into liquidation in early 2025 after failing to find a buyer, possibly sealing the fate of all 5 brands.

=== City Chic Collective (2018–present) ===
In April 2019, City Chic Collective acquired U.S. plus-size intimates brand Hips & Curves for US$2 million. In October 2019, CCC purchased the e-commerce assets of Avenue Stores from its administrator.

In December 2020, City Chic Collective reached an agreement to purchase the Evans brand, website and wholesale business for £23 million after its parent company Arcadia Group went into administration. The deal did not include the retailer's stores.

In July 2021, CCC acquired European plus-size online retailer Navabi for A$9.6 million.

City Chic Collective exited the EMEA market in August 2023, selling its Evans business to AK Retail (owner of M&Co.) for A$15.5 million. The Navabi brand was also shut down at the same time. CCC sold its Avenue brand to FullBeauty Brands in June 2024 for $14.5 million. In August 2024, City Chic launched its first bridal line.
