= Clint's Crazy Bargains =

Australian discount retailer

- Type: Discount retail
- Founded: 1978; 48 years ago
- Founder: David & Kerry Rickards and Norm & Sue O'Neill
- Defunct: 2000; 26 years ago
- Fate: Sold to The Warehouse
- Successor: The Warehouse
- Area served: Victoria, New South Wales, Australian Capital Territory

Clint's Crazy Bargains was established in November 1978, as a partnership between David and Kerry Rickards, and Norm and Sue O'Neill.

It was a retailer of discount variety merchandise including gifts, cosmetics, clothing, books, craft goods, hardware, stationery, toys, jewellery, kitchenware, caneware, haberdashery, manchester, small electrical goods, luggage and furniture.

== History ==
The Business was initially a single store (Bankstown, New South Wales) and a market stall operation dealing primarily in distressed and surplus merchandise bought from public auction. A second store in Leichhardt (October 1980) followed by the move into substantially larger premises of 7,000 square feet (650 m^{2}) in Bankstown (April 1981) saw the commencement of a serious attempt to build a new retail concept.

The St Marys store (July 1983), spectacularly successful in 4,000 square feet (370 m^{2}), became the prototype of the new "discount variety" or "bargain store". As the business evolved through wholesaling and new shop openings, techniques and policies changed constantly, but the theme of the "Bargain Store" remained. A diverse range of goods that were cheap.

Throughout the early and mid-1980s, the principal product source continued to be distressed or opportunity merchandise. As stock needs increased the weakness of such a dependence emerged, low-cost-manufactured goods from South East Asia became the target. Volandu Pty Ltd was formed in October 1985 as an import company with the same ownership as Clints.

Wholesaling was commenced to increase purchasing power and credibility overseas. The continuing growth of Clints and similar chains in other states brought about fanatic import volume increases. From 100 containers in 1987 to over 3,000 in 1995. The original 23,000-square-foot warehouse was replaced by a 50,000-square-foot (4,600 m^{2}) warehouse in 1990, only to be replaced by a 215,000-square-foot (20,000 m^{2}) warehouse complex purchased in January 1992. Also in 1992, a warehouse in China was completed for the consolidation of goods for Clints and other Volandu customers. This facility allowed flexibility and control over a massive range of cheap products being produced in southern China.

An additional distribution warehouse of a 100,000 square feet (9,300 m^{2}) was purchased in February 1995 in Footscray, Victoria, Australia, to service the then growing number of Victorian stores and to facilitate the movement of increasing volumes of merchandise between Sydney and Melbourne.

The business operated 116 stores across New South Wales, Victoria and the ACT, and eventually acquired Fair Dinkum Bargains and Silly Sollys.

== Acquisitions ==
In 2000 the Clint's Crazy Bargains business was sold to the New Zealand company The Warehouse.

In 2008 the remaining stores were sold to a group of Australian investors, Australian Discount Retail, and subsequently renamed Sam's Warehouse.
