= Sypkes family =

Australian business family

Purity Supermarket
- Type: Subsidiary
- Industry: Retail
- Founded: 1958; 68 years ago
- Founder: Engel Sypkes
- Defunct: 1981; 45 years ago
- Fate: Acquired by Woolworths
- Number of locations: 16 stores (1981)
- Area served: Tasmania
- Parent: Woolworths Group

The Sypkes are a prominent business family from Tasmania, Australia. They came to prominence after they immigrated to Tasmania from the Netherlands, where Engel Sypkes went on to found the Purity supermarket chain in 1958. The chain was sold in 1981, at the time encompassing 16 stores. The family presently owns, in addition to 50% of Shiploads, the Sypkes group which consists of their real estate and investment holdings across Tasmania.

== Sypkes Family ==
=== Engel Sypkes ===
Engel Sypkes was an Australian businessman from the Netherlands who migrated to Tasmania in 1951.

In 1951, Engel, his wife Ann and their three children migrated from the Netherlands amid new threats of war in Europe. They came by plane on the same flight as the Vos family, who established the Roelf Vos supermarket chain in northern Tasmania.

Shortly after arriving in Tasmania, the family opened a small general store in Stanley. After a trip to the United States Sypkes was exposed to 'Modern Merchandising Methods'. Shortly after his return to Tasmania he opened their first Purity supermarket in Hobart in 1958. Before its sale to the Woolworths conglomerate in 1981, his supermarket chain encompassed sixteen stores throughout southern Tasmania.

=== Peter Sypkes ===
Engel's sons Peter and Rudie Sypkes founded Chickenfeed in 1990, a chain of discount variety stores located throughout Tasmania and sold in 2001 for an estimated $35 million (AUD).

In 2017, Peter sold his holdings in Aconex as part of a takeover bid by Oracle Corporation for an estimated 12.8 million.

Peter Sypkes was appointed honorary consul of the Netherlands to Tasmania in 2012. He is the patron of the Dutch Australia Society

=== Rudie Sypkes ===
Rudie Sypkes went on to invest in various businesses, including an investment advisory company, real estate in Queensland and oil in Texas. In 2002, Rudie was appointed honorary consul for the Czech Republic to Tasmania and in 2007 won the AICD Tasmania Gold Medal Director of the Year, presented by the Governor of Tasmania. He was also a director of the Tasmanian Institute of Law Enforcement Studies

Rudie Sypkes died of Idiopathic pulmonary fibrosis in 2007. Before his death the Sypkes family donated $600,000 (AUD) for respiratory medicine research. His passing was noted by the media and politicians, with tributes made by the Premier, State Opposition Leader and during a session of the federal parliament Senator David Bushby.

=== Andrew Sypkes ===
Rudie Sypkes son Andrew Sypkes invested in the Shiploads chain of discount stores in 2011, just shortly before the collapse of the family's former company Chickenfeed, the main competitor of their new venture. They were blamed for contributing to the demise of Chickenfeed by the company's communication manager, because of their continued ownership of a number of the store locations. He is also an investor in construction tech company Varicon.
