= John's Bargain Store =

- Industry: Retail
- Headquarters: United States

John's Bargain Store was a chain of variety stores in the Northeast and Midwest of the United States. It was founded in 1955.

The stores were, according to the New York Times:

"with its big red sign and white lettering... once a nearly ubiquitous presence in the New York metropolitan area, particularly in low-income sections. It grazed the low end of retailing... paying cheap rent for locations few other retailers wanted... buying merchandise that could be startlingly inexpensive, often because the manufacturer had overestimated demand."

There were 527 John's Bargain Stores in the Northeast and in Puerto Rico at its zenith in the mid-1960s. Between 1961 and 1965 the chain earned $1,000,000 per year or more in profits each year. However, in 1966 they ran a $523,947 (~$3.76 million in 2023) loss. Shoplifting was a problem, among others. John's had an average 32% markup on its goods, versus an average of 40% across its competitors. By September 1967, bankruptcy had been declared, there were 474 stores with sales of $62 million (~$432 million in 2023), and about 200 of the stores operated at a loss. The company had $15,788,291 in assets and $11,659,444 in debt.
