= Sam's Warehouse =

Australian brand of discount retail stores

- Type: Discount retail
- Founded: 2008
- Defunct: 2015
- Fate: Closure
- Headquarters: North Ryde, Sydney, NSW, Australia
- Key people: Penny Moss (COO), Wayne Fowler (Operation's Manager)
- Owner: Jan Cameron
- Number of employees: 5000
- Parent: DSG Holdings Aust Pty Ltd (Discount Superstores Group)

Sam's Warehouse was an Australian brand of discount retail stores, similar to Crazy Clark's. It was founded in 2008 after The Warehouse sold its Australian operations to Australian Discount Retail, and the stores were required to be re-branded.

== History ==
In 2000, The Warehouse expanded its New Zealand chain of discount stores into the Australian retail market. It acquired the Clint's Crazy Bargains and Silly Solly's retail chains. At the time of purchase, these chains had around 117 stores. In 2003 the company built a A$33 million distribution centre in Queensland, to service the country.

However, in 2005, the Australian operation was under-performing. Sales for 2005 were at A$518.8 million, compared with A$567.3 million in 2004. The Warehouse Group Limited announced in November 2005 that it had entered into a conditional agreement to sell The Warehouse Australia business to Catalyst Investment Managers and its parent PPM Capital Limited (together, Catalyst) and Castle Harlan Australian Mezzanine Partners, acting on behalf of the CHAMP I and CHAMP II funds (CHAMP) for A$92 million (NZ$99m). The new entity was known as Australian Discount Retail (ADR). As part of the transaction, The Warehouse Australia's Sydney Head Office would be sold to Investec Wentworth Specialised Property Trust. The Warehouse Australia, Crazy Clark's and Tasmanian chain Chickenfeed were now all owned by Australian Discount Retail, almost giving the company a monopoly over the discount trading market in Australia.

Due to the change in ownership, Australian Discount Retail was required to re-brand all Australian Warehouse stores to avoid any potential brand confusion. At the start of 2008, the company began re-branding all stores with the name, "Sam's Warehouse". By the end of 2008, all The Warehouse stores in Australia had been completely re-branded.

At the start of 2009, despite the near monopoly, Australian Discount Retail went into voluntary administration with debts of over $90 million. The size and scale of Australian Discount Retail made this the biggest collapse of an Australian retail business in over five years. Shop Distributive and Allied Retailers Association's Joe De Bruyn stated that the collapse should not just be blamed on the financial crisis, but the nature of its merchandise and poor merchandising management.

On 23 March 2009 it was announced that the company had been sold to Retail Adventures Pty Ltd, a company owned by Australian millionaire Jan Cameron, the former owner of Kathmandu, for an undisclosed sum. Cameron and the CEO of Retail Adventures, David Young, announced in October 2010 that they wished to simplify the number of brands owned by the company and that Sam's Warehouse, Crazy Clark's and Chickenfeed would all be merged into Chickenfeed, with the slogan "Bargains With A Smile", stating that the Chickenfeed brand was the most profitable. However, considering Retail Adventures has gone into administration and is closing Chickenfeed stores outside of Tasmania, this is unlikely to occur. In late 2014, Sam's Warehouse was being sold to other retailers. The last of the stores were closed or sold in mid-2015.
