= KMD Brands =

New Zealand retail company

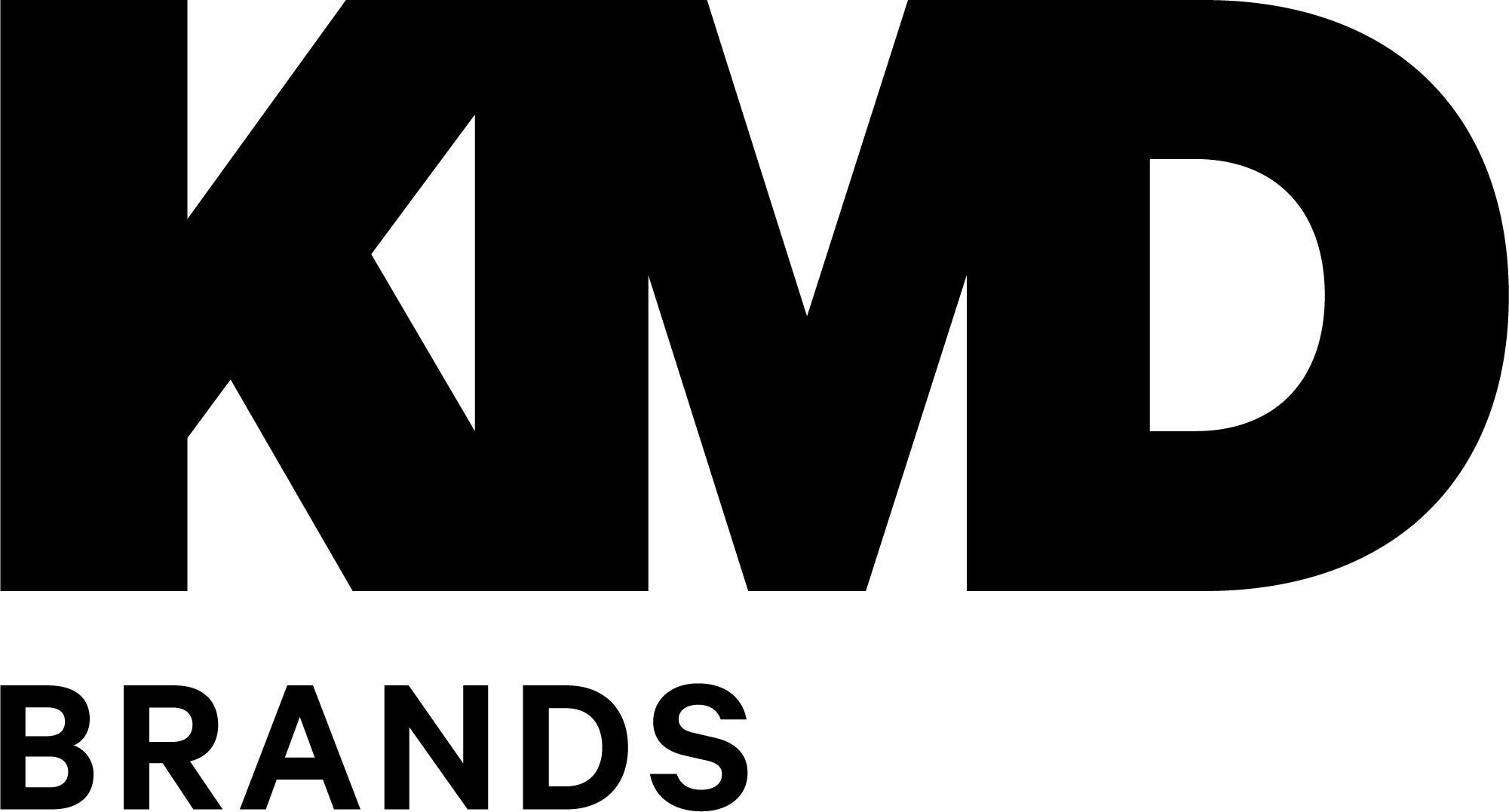
- Formerly: Kathmandu Holdings
- Type: Public
- Traded as: NZX: KMD; ASX: KMD
- Industry: Retail
- Founded: 1987 in Christchurch, New Zealand
- Founders: Jan Cameron; John Pawson
- Headquarters: Christchurch, New Zealand
- Area served: New Zealand, Australia, United States, United Kingdom
- Key people: Brent Scrimshaw (CEO); David Kirk (Chairman)
- Products: Outdoor and travel apparel, gear and accessories
- Revenue: NZ$923 million (2021)
- Net income: NZ$114 million (2021)
- Number of employees: 1,144 full-time equivalent
- Subsidiaries: Kathmandu; Oboz; Rip Curl
- Website: www.kmdbrands.com

KMD Brands is a global outdoor, lifestyle and sports company and Certified B Corporation. It consists of three iconic brands: Kathmandu, Rip Curl and Oboz. The Group is dual-listed on the NZX and ASX. Kathmandu was founded in 1987 in New Zealand and specialises in technical and sustainable clothing and equipment for outdoors adventures. Oboz, acquired by the group in 2018, is based in Bozeman, Montana, and designs footwear for hiking and trail running. Rip Curl, acquired in 2019, is a global surf brand founded in 1969 at Bells Beach and headquartered in Torquay, Victoria.

== History ==
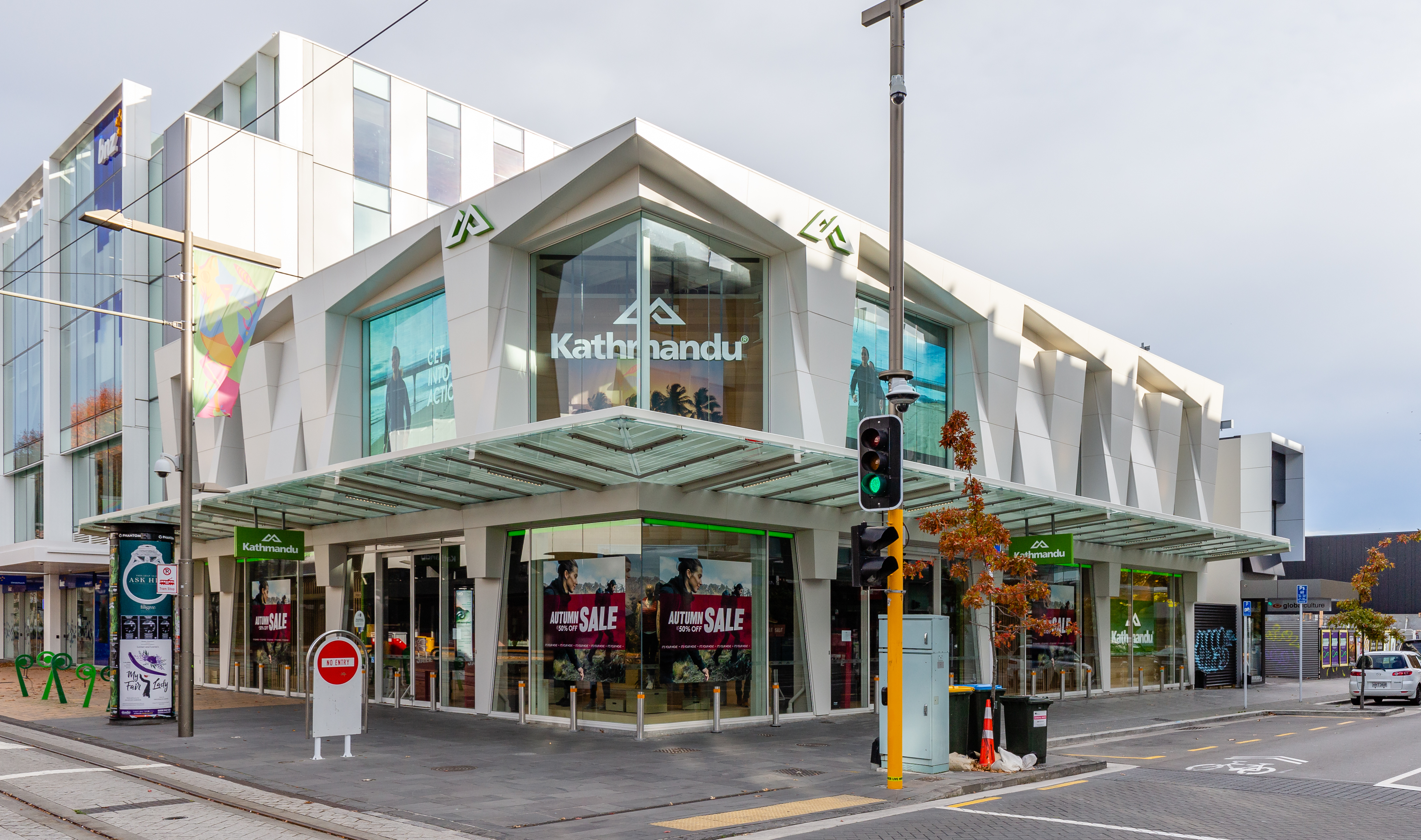
Kathmandu outlet in Christchurch

Kathmandu was founded by John Pawson and Jan Cameron in 1987 following their sale of the ALP Sports Clothing label. The company set up its first retail outlets in Australia, whilst manufacturing most of its original clothing range in New Zealand. Bernard Wicht, owner of Alpine Accoutrements, had been the main manufacturer for ALP Sports but continued to manufacture for Kathmandu and also partnered with Penny Hazard to set up the Bivouac chain of stores in New Zealand. In 1992 Kathmandu, having established a strong operation in Australia (with stores in Sydney, Melbourne, Brisbane and Canberra) re-entered the New Zealand retail marketplace, purchasing Alps Sports from its receivers and brought in Bernard Wicht to join John Pawson and Jan Cameron as a third shareholder.

In 2006, Quadrant Private Equity bought the company for NZ$275 million, after Cameron had previously sold half of her business. Wicht was the owner of both the Fairydown and Macpac brands until 2015.

Kathmandu was listed on the Australian and New Zealand stock exchanges in November 2009. Kathmandu announced the purchase of Oboz in March 2018. In October 2019, Kathmandu announced it would buy 100% of Australian surf brand Rip Curl for A$350m. In March 2022, Kathmandu Holdings was rebranded KMD Brands.

== Environmental, Social, and Governance Strategy ==
KMD Brands and each of its brands are Certified B Corporations. Kathmandu became a Certified B Corporation in 2019 and the brand recertified as part of Group in 2023 alongside Rip Curl and Oboz. The Group considers the United Nations' Sustainable Development Goals in its ESG strategy and reporting, which underpins all business activities.

In FY25, KMD Brands was recognised by Australian media publication Ragtrader for its ESG leadership and continued commitment to excellence within the outdoor and lifestyle apparel industry.

== Events and sponsorship ==
Rip Curl is the founder and title sponsor of the Rip Curl Pro, one of the longest-running professional surfing competitions and a core event on the World Surf League Championship Tour. First held in 1973 at Bells Beach in Victoria, Australia, the event has been a consistent fixture on the professional surfing calendar.

Alongside its involvement in elite tour competition, Rip Curl has supported a range of invitational and grassroots surf events, including association with the Eddie Aikau Big Wave Invitational at Waimea Bay in Hawaii, the Rip Curl Cup Padang Padang in Indonesia, and the Rip Curl GromSearch, a long-running global junior competition series focused on youth development, as part of its broader involvement in professional sport and surf culture.

Kathmandu is the Official Apparel Partner of the New Zealand Team. The apparel is designed and tested in New Zealand's alpine and winter environments, and has been developed for the NZ Team's training, village and ceremonial wardrobes for the Olympic Winter Games Milano-Cortina 2026.

Since 2017 Kathmandu had naming rights for the Coast to Coast race in New Zealand. Kathmandu launched a series with National Geographic, called Eco Traveller, which focuses on eco-friendly travel and sustainable tourism. Eco Traveller is hosted by Nick Saxon from National Geographic.

== Wage subsidy controversy ==
Like other businesses operating in New Zealand, Kathmandu received sizeable financial support from the New Zealand government in the form of wage subsidies for its employees across New Zealand. This was part of a wider policy of economic stimulus for large and small businesses following the COVID-19 outbreak and the resulting downturn in the economy. As part of this programme, Kathmandu Group received $6.2 million from New Zealand taxpayers in 2020. However, despite subsequently posting a profit of NZ $31.5 million, Kathmandu management refused to repay the funds even though the company had enjoyed a profitable year. This decision was condemned on both sides of the political spectrum in New Zealand with the two major parties describing it as unfair. Kathmandu's decision was also labelled as an example of the "waste" and "fraud" in the wage subsidy scheme treasury had earlier warned of.

== See also ==
- List of mountaineering equipment brands
- List of outdoor industry parent companies
