= FullBeauty Brands =

Plus size clothing company

- Formerly: OneStopPlus Group
- Industry: Online retail
- Founded: 1901
- Headquarters: New York City, U.S.
- Area served: Nationwide
- Key people: Jim Fogarty, CEO
- Products: Women’s plus-size clothing, intimates, sleepwear, swimwear, shoes & accessories; men’s big-and-tall clothing
- Website: www.fbbrands.com

FullBeauty Brands Operations, LLC is an umbrella holding company with multiple brands focusing on women’s plus-size apparel, men’s big-and-tall clothing, intimates, sleepwear, swimwear, shoes and accessories, beauty and home furnishings. Its brands include: Woman Within, Roaman's, Catherines, Jessica London, ELOQUII, June & Vie, ellos, Swimsuits For All, BrylaneHome, KingSize, Full Beauty OUTLET, OneStopPlus, CUUP, Dia & Co, avenue and Joe Browns.

== History ==
FullBeauty Brands was founded in 1901 in New York City. In 1924, the company launched its first fashion catalog. In 1941, the mail-order business moved to Indiana, where the company fulfills catalog and online orders from its fulfillment centers in Indianapolis and Plainfield.

Over the decades, the company grew by acquiring and creating over a dozen brands, mainly but not exclusively in the plus-size category. Its first acquisition was the 1982 purchase of Roaman’s, a women’s plus-size clothing company. Through the 1990s and 2000s the company expanded, acquiring and launching numerous brands, including one in home furnishings.

FullBeauty Brands acquisitions and launches (1995–2025)
Brand or Company	Category	Launched or Acquired
avenue	Plus-size affordable fashion for women, sizes 14-36	Acquired
BrylaneHome	Affordable home furnishings and décor	Launched
Catherines	Contemporary plus-size women’s fashion focused on fit	Acquired
CUUP	Plus-size lingerie and intimates, A-H cups and 30-50 band sizes	Acquired
Dia & Co	Fashion-forward plus-size women's designs, includes hundreds of brands, sizes 10-32	Acquired
ellos	Women’s minimalist Swedish-inspired fashion design, sizes 10-44	Acquired
ELOQUII	Plus-size casual, evening and outerwear for women, sizes 14-32	Acquired
Fullbeauty OUTLET	Low-priced women's plus-size and men's big-and-tall clothing	Launched
Jessica London	Women’s work and casual clothing, sizes 12-44	Acquired
Joe Browns	Fashionable plus-size clothing with British flair	Acquired
June & Vie	Women’s plus-size fashion clothing, sizes 10-32	Acquired
KingSize	Big and tall men’s clothing, sizes to 10XL	Acquired
OneStopPlus	Online mall with 100s of brands, plus-size clothing, shoes, and swimwear	Launched
Roaman's	Plus-size women's fashions in sizes 12-44	Acquired
Swimsuits For All	Women's plus-size swimwear, sizes 4-44 & DD+ bra cups	Launched
Woman Within	Plus-size women's casual wear, sized 12-44	Launched

== Ownership ==
In February 2013, the company, then known as OneStopPlus Group, was purchased by Charlesbank Capital Partners and Webster Capital. In 2015, the company rebranded as FullBeauty Brands. In October of that year, FullBeauty Brands was acquired by Apax Partners, a European buyout firm. Since 2019, FullBeauty has been majority-owned by Goldman Sachs, Oaktree Capital Management, and Clearlake Capital Group.

== FullBeauty Brands’ Collaborations ==
- In 2024, OneStopPlus partnered with the Fashion Institute of Technology to encourage young fashion designers to pursue careers in the plus-size fashion industry.
- On September 26, 2024, ELOQUII announced a collaboration with Kate Spade New York to create a plus-size, limited-edition assortment of ready-to-wear for the holiday season.
- In 2023, plus-size model, Emme and Syracuse University collaborated with OneStopPlus to hold a competition for fashion design students to create "the next 'It' style for curvy women." The contest was part of Emme's Fashion Without Limits body-positivity initiative.
- On May 4, 2022, size-inclusive swimwear brand Swimsuits For All launched an on-air and online collaboration with QVC designer, Kim Gravel.

== Support for body positivity ==
FullBeauty has supported body positivity in promoting plus-size messaging. In 2015 the company ran a campaign called "OwnYourCurves" which sought to alter consumers' perceptions of size and shape as they related to beauty through the positive portrayal of plus-size women. Meghan Trainor partnered with the company in the campaign. In 2023, Swimsuits for All launched its “All for You” campaign which followed a diverse group of six plus-size professional women on their journey to self-acceptance and finding the perfect swimwear fit.
