= Crazy Clark's =

Australian company

- Type: Discount retail
- Defunct: 2014
- Headquarters: North Ryde, New South Wales, Sydney, Australia
- Number of locations: 143 (2014)
- Owner: Jan Cameron
- Number of employees: 2,500 (2014)
- Parent: DSG Holdings Aust Pty Ltd (Discount Superstores Group)

Crazy Clark's Discount Variety Store was an Australian company that operated over 150 discount variety stores in its chain, across Queensland, New South Wales, Northern Territory and Western Australia. The company also owned and operated a chain store called Go-Lo.

== About ==
Crazy Clark's sells clothing, cosmetics, toys, homewares, electronics goods, garden ware, confectionery and more. Crazy Clark's was the worldwide trademark owner of the Crazy Clark's logo and name with respect to retail stores. It was a subsidiary of the Discount Superstores Group.

Crazy Clarks went into voluntary administration on 1 July 2014, eventually closing all of the stores the following month in August 2014.
