= Homeart =

Australian retail store chain

- Company type: Private
- Industry: Retail
- Founded: Melbourne, Australia (1977)
- Founder: Aart van Roest and Amy van Roest
- Defunct: 2015
- Fate: Voluntary administration
- Headquarters: Bella Vista, Australia, Australia
- Number of locations: 140
- Area served: Australia
- Key people: Amy van Roest (Director)
- Products: Homewares, Manchester, Giftware, Small Electrical, Furniture, Kitchenware
- Owner: Amy van Roest
- Number of employees: 850
- Parent: Copperart Holdings Pty Limited

Homeart, also previously known as Copperart, was a national chain of retail stores with outlets in every state in Australia selling mostly homewares, giftware and electrical products.

== History ==
The company's origins can be traced back to Melbourne's eastern suburbs and the Croydon Stockyards (flea market) in 1970. On 1 August 1979, Mr and Mrs van Roest's first store to carry the name Copperart was opened on Canterbury Road, Blackburn, Victoria. This was followed soon after by another six stores.

Initially, the business sold copper and brassware from around the world, as well as grandfather clocks and wall clocks. The name Copperart derives from the material the products were made from (copper) and the name of the original founder Aart. Copperart initially sold mostly copper and brass products, but the company expanded in the 1980s to include a broader range of homewares.

=== 2001: rebranding ===
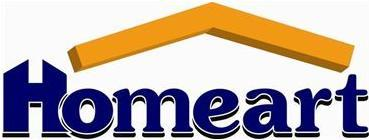
Previous Homeart logo used from 2001 to 2010

By the year 2000, the product range in the Copperart stores had changed dramatically and bore little resemblance to original concept; the once famous copper and brass had virtually disappeared. In late 2001, Copperart changed its trading name to Homeart. It was felt that the "Copperart" name implied only a small range of copper and related products were stocked, when in fact the stores sold a wide range of products including manchester, clocks, electrical, homewares, dolls, furniture, sports and leisure and outdoor gear.

=== 2010: logo update and changes ===
In mid-2010, Homeart updated its logo replacing the large roof with a smaller, more subtle one, giving it a more modern look. The font and colour were also changed to a more modern style and distinctive "Homeart" orange.

=== 2015: Closure ===
In January 2015, liquidators were appointed for the 116 Homeart stores, with the announcement made in March of that year that all stores would close, having failed to find a buyer for the business.

== Advertising ==
Through its regular use of television advertising, Copperart became an iconic Australian company. During the 1990s, Copperart television commercials used the well-known Pete Smith, best known for his voiceovers on Sale of the Century, The Don Lane Show, and In Melbourne Tonight. In the 2000s, large catalogue distributions were the company's preferred choice of advertising, and television commercials ceased. In late 2009, Homeart aired a television advertisement to promote its goods for the Christmas season.

== Pop culture ==
Copperart was featured several times in the early 1990s on the sketch comedy show Fast Forward and The Late Show. The sketches were parodies of Copperart's television commercials with comedian Steve Vizard lampooning Pete Smith.
