= Jan Cameron =

New Zealand-Australian businesswoman

Jan Cameron CNZM
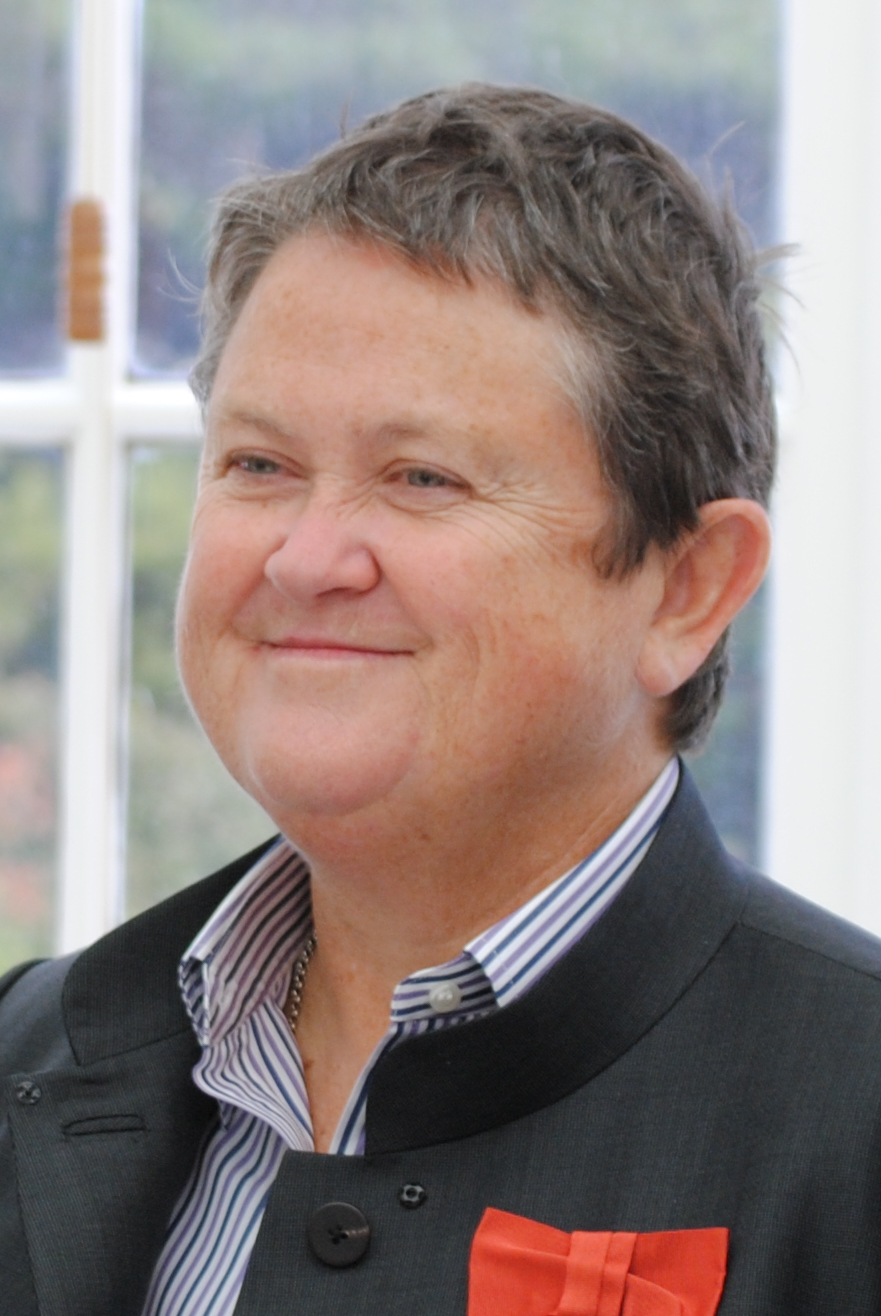
- Cameron in 2011
- Born: 1951 or 1952 (age 74–75); Melbourne, Victoria, Australia
- Occupations: Owner of Retail Adventures; Retired founder of Kathmandu
- Spouse: Bernie Wicht (divorced)

Jan Cameron CNZM is a New Zealand-Australian businesswoman and formerly Australia's fourth-richest woman. She made her fortune as the founder of the Kathmandu clothing and outdoor equipment company. She currently lives in Bicheno, Tasmania. She runs various companies and business interests, which together span Britain, New Zealand and Australia. She is a philanthropist and supporter of animal welfare.

In 2006, Cameron sold 51% of her share of Kathmandu for A$247 million, making her the fourth-richest woman in Australia. It was reported in September 2013 she had lost almost 90% of her fortune in the collapse of her company Retail Adventures, which entered receivership earlier that year.

== Companies ==
Cameron was the sole shareholder of Retail Adventures, when it was placed into receivership in 2012 with debts to unsecured creditors of $165 million. In early 2013 she successfully bid to buy the company out of receivership for $58.9 million.

Bentham IMF litigation funders gave notice in March 2013 of a possible class action lawsuit and is seeking a public examination of whether the company traded insolvent prior to receivership. Bentham IMF also raised questions about "director related payments" shortly before the company went into administration and the status of secured debts owed by Retail Adventures to entities related to Cameron. Their case and following appeal was dismissed. On 3 July 2014, it was reported mediation between her and liquidators of Retail Adventures, Deloitte, had broken down and the firm would be pursuing a public examination of the conditions surrounding the collapse of Retail Adventures, including alleged insolvent trading.

She also owns stakes in several other major retail companies; she owns 9% of Pumpkin Patch, 58% of Macpac, and 19% of the Postie Plus Group. In 2008 she purchased the Arbuckles manchester chain off struggling Postie Plus for an undisclosed sum in June 2008, later liquidating the business in August that year so she could use the locations to open her Dog's Breakfast furniture company. Dog's Breakfast was shut down in 2010, with some stores converted to NOOD (New Objects of Desire), also a furniture retail company owned by Cameron, some to Chickenfeed stores—which itself later shut down—and some not replaced.

It was reported in June 2014 Jan Cameron was the major backer of baby-food company Bellamy's Organic, which will begin its IPO on the Australian Securities Exchange (ASX) in July, estimated to be worth $100 million. In December 2023, she was convicted for failing to disclose the purchase of shares in Bellamy's in 2014, and for submitting a misleading shareholder notice to the ASX in 2017. She pleaded not guilty to the charges in 2020. She was found guilty in December 2023, and will be sentenced in 2024.

In 2016, Cameron was involved in an unsuccessful bid for Australia's oldest and largest dairy, Van Diemen's Land Company dairy. Federal Treasurer Scott Morrison, citing national interest, permitted its sale to Moon Lake Investments, a Chinese company, for A$ 280 million. Another failed bidder for the dairy, TasFoods, was awarded $1.25 million in damages from Van Diemen's Land Company for breach of contract in regards to the sale. Cameron later stated that Morrison had "betrayed the future of Australians" as the sale was the latest during a public debate over foreign ownership of Australia's most fertile land.

In April 2023, Tribe Noteholders, a group of convertible noteholders which included Cameron, took ownership of craft beer company Tribe Brewing, which went in administration in February that year.

=== Kathmandu ===
Cameron founded the Kathmandu adventure wear company alongside John Pawson in 1987 after selling Alp Sports, her first company. She started in the early 1970s by sewing sleeping bags to sell in Alp Sports, before she and her ex-husband bought half of Kathmandu and changed to selling Chinese-produced products. In 1991 Kathmandu brought back Alp Sports, therefore expanding Kathmandu into New Zealand, and then in 1994 John Pawson was bought out by Cameron and her ex-husband Bernard Wicht, leaving Wicht and Cameron as the sole owners of Kathmandu. Two years later in 1996, Cameron bought out her ex-husband's share of Kathmandu.

In 2006 she sold 51% of her share in Kathmandu to a private equity firm for A$247 million, and several months later she sold her remaining 49% of the company.

== Philanthropy ==
Cameron is a philanthropist and supporter of animal welfare and various charities. In 2010 she founded the Animal Justice Fund, donating five million dollars to start the organisation, which states its mission as "to promote the cause of animal welfare through strategic litigation, public awareness campaigns and the prosecution of persons or businesses who commit offences against animals used in intensive farming or through commercial and/or recreational practices."

The following year, in May 2011, Cameron donated 60 acres on the Freycinet Peninsula to start one of three Devil Islands; safe havens for Tasmanian devil breeding populations to be isolated from populations infected with the devil facial tumour disease. She has also supported Brightside Animal Sanctuary, an animal sanctuary in Cygnet, Tasmania, through the Elsie Cameron Fund, for several years. Cameron has also continued to donate profits from all Chickenfeed stores in Tasmania to various charities, for the last two years.

Cameron gained media attention in Tasmania when she and Graeme Wood, founder of Wotif.com purchased the Triabunna native forest woodchip mill in 2011 from Gunns, installing former Wilderness Society executive director Alec Marr as manager. After the Premier of Tasmania Lara Giddings contacted her, it was agreed that the woodchip mill would continue for 4 to 5 years, before it is converted into the planned eco-resort. Currently, the mill is not in operation.

== Legal Issues ==
Jan Cameron was charged by the Australian Securities & Investments Commission (ASIC) in 2020 of using an offshore entity to hide control of $14 million in Bellamy's shares. She was found guilty in December 2023, and was convicted and fined $8,000 in March 2024.

== Honours ==
In the 2010 Queen's Birthday Honours, Cameron was appointed a Companion of the New Zealand Order of Merit, for services to business and philanthropy. Her investiture by the Governor-General of New Zealand took place on 14 April 2011.
