= List of discount shops in the United Kingdom =

This is a list of the current and defunct discount chains of the United Kingdom. This list does not include discount supermarket chains which can be found at list of supermarket chains in the United Kingdom.

== List of current discount shops ==
Brand	Image	Founded / Came to UK	Owner	# of shops	Notes
B&M		1978	B&M European Value Retail S.A.	741	The business was founded by Malcolm Billington as Billington & Mayman and the first store opened in Cleveleys, England, in 1978 and was acquired by Simon and Bobby Arora from Phildrew Investments in December 2004
Bargain Buys		2013	Fortress Investment Group	61	Brand launched by Poundworld founder Chris Edwards to replace former DiscountUK brand, which closed with failure of parent company. Restarted as a sister brand by Poundstretcher.
BJ's Value House				2	South West based Home & Garden discounter, owned by the Ford Family of Ford & Lock / Brian Ford Discount Superstore fame.
Boyes		1881	Boyes family	81	Family owned discount shops department store chain based in Scarborough. Stores primarily in the North of England and East Midlands.
The Factory Shops		c.1980s	The Factory Shops Essex Ltd	3	Family run Essex-based discount shop
Flying Tiger Copenhagen		2005	Modella Capital	82	Danish discount shop based primarily in the South East
Home Bargains		1976		617	
In-Excess UK				8	Discounter based in Hampshire and Dorset
MINISO		2019	MINISO Group Holding Limited	52	Chinese discounter
OneBeyond		2018	Christopher Edwards Sr.	100	
Poundland		1991	Gordon Brothers	600 (approx)	Largest single price discounter in the UK
Poundstretcher		1981	Fortress Investment Group	263	
Proper Job		1997	Tilley Family	21	Father and son Ray and Peter Tilley started Tilley's Tools in Cornwall, before running it as a wholesale business from Weston Super Mare. Proper Job was started in 1997 is based in Somerset.
QD			QD Commercial Group Holdings	31	Discount group based mainly in East of England & the Home Counties
Savers		1988	AS Watson	500	Discount branded health, home and beauty.
The Range		1989	Chris Dawson	277	Discount home and hardware originally called Chris Dawson Superstores (C.D.S.)
This Is It Famous Value Shops					Chain of discount shops located in Devon, Dorset and Somerset
Tradecounter		c.1990s			South Essex based home and hardware discount shop with at one time five shops
Trago Mills		Early 1960s		4	South West based discount department stores
Wilko		1930	Chris Dawson	7	Launched in December 2023, the previous incarnation was founded in 1930, and went into administration in August 2023.
Yorkshire Trading Company		1964	Nichols Family	39	

== List of defunct discount shops ==
Discount shop	Image	Founded / Came to UK	Closed / Brand discontinued	Owned by	Number of shops	Notes
99p Stores		2001	2016	Lalani family	259	99p Stores purchased by Poundland in 2015 rebranded as Poundland
Alworths		2009	2011		18	Rebranded from Woolworths, entered administration in 2011
Bargain Crazy						
Barmy Bobs						Trading name of Yorkshire Trading Company that was phased out
Basildon Stores			2012		5	Discount home, garden and hardware chain based in South Essex, closed due to retirement
Bewise			2006	Hamsard 2353	200	Discount homeware and clothing retailer, went into administration 2006, some shops were purchased by new chain Store Twenty One
The Big Label			2009		5	Formerly QS Discount, owned by QS Stores; owned five shops in Blackburn, Sale, Atherton, Warrington and Chorley
CDS Superstores		1989		Chris Dawson		Discount chain rebranded as The Range
DiscountUK		2011	2013	Chris Edwards and Chris Edwards Junior	41	Re-branded as Bargain Buys
Family Bargains		2010	2016	Poundland		A sister brand of the 99p shop, which was rebranded as Poundland Plus after 99p Stores' purchase.
Glyn Webb			2006		22	Former discount DIY chain
Grandfare	1967					Early discount store in Shiprow, Aberdeen, which became What Everyone Wants.
HEMA		2014	2021	Lion Capital LLP	9	London-centric Dutch discount shop that started in Amsterdam in 1926
House of Holland			c.1980s			South of England-based discount department store went into administration late 80s
Hypervalue		1980	2009	Hilco		Discount chain mainly located in South Wales, but had shops as afar as Southampton, bought by Hilco in 2006 before going into administration
Instore		2002	2007	instore plc		...instore was a new corporate name that failed for £-stretcher business – name reverted to Poundstretcher
Max 99p		2013	2018		4	Family owned chain of discount shops located in Peterborough, Chelmsford, Pontypridd and Woolston. Went into liquidation in 2018.
JC Nicholls						Trading name operated by the Yorkshire Trading Company that was phased out.
One Up		1993			16	Clothing and Home discounter created by Storehouse plc, sold off in 1995 for £20m
The Original Factory Shop		1969	2026	Modella Capital	180	United Kingdom discount department store., liquidated in 2026
Parker Franks				Owned by Philip Green		Northwest-based discounter of homewares and clothing; changed its name to Xception
Poundworld		1974	2018	TPG	>300	Business started as market stall in Wakefield; branded Poundworld from 2004. Also traded as Poundworld Extra and Poundworld Plus
Quality Save		1974	2024	Richard Rudkin & Paul Rudkin	21	Business started as a market stall in Walkden, north-based discount chain. Taken over by Home Bargains and rebranded.
QS Stores		1932	2006	Hamsard 2353	143	QS started life as a clothing manufacturer. In 1960s they opened their first shop selling clothing rejected by main buyer Marks & Spencer. In 1980s the shop stopped selling seconds and went private in 1990. Was purchased by Hamsard 2353 in 2003 who brought it together with fellow purchase Bewise. Business went into administration in 2006. Some shops became part of Store Twenty One.
Shop Direct Group					10	Discounter of surplus stock from within the Shop Direct family of companies
Store Twenty One		2007	2017	Grabal Alok	200	Discount clothing and homewares, created from the ashes of QS Stores and Bewise
Thing - Me - Bobs			2022	QD Commercial Group Holdings	11	Stores purchased by QD in 2013. Moved to QD branding in 2022.
Waremart			2009			Chain of discounters based in Yorkshire and northeast in former Woolworths shops
What Everyone Wants		1990	2003	Tradegro	130	Formerly What Every Woman Wants, a Scottish chain of discount shops that became UK national in 1990 after its purchase by Brown & Jackson, owners of £-Stretcher. Sold to Tradegro in November 2002 before going into administration a month later. Locations were bought by Poundstretcher and Bewise
Woolworths		1909	2009	Woolworths Group plc	807	Company went into administration, name lives on as a web-based retailer owned by Shop Direct Group
Xception				Philip Green		New name for northwest-based Parker Franks, a discounter selling a variety of clothes and homewares
Your Home Stores						Greater Manchester based discounter of homewares
Your More Store		1991	2004	Tradegro	199	Set up Pepkor in 1991, the stores were based in Scotland and the North East of England. Bought by Brown & Jackson, owners of £-stretcher in 1997, before being sold to Tradegro in 2003 while in administration.
