= Christopher Edwards (businessman) =

British businessman (born 1950)

Christopher Edwards Sr.
- Born: 2 June 1950 (age 76)
- Occupation: Businessman
- Years active: 1974–2026
- Known for: Founder of Poundworld, Bargain Buys, and OneBeyond

Christopher Edwards Sr. (born 2 June 1950) is a British retired businessman.

== Career ==
Edwards began his career with a market stall in Wakefield, in 1974. He established Poundworld in 2003. In 2013, he established Bargain Buys. In October 2018, Edwards alongside his son, founded OneBeyond.

Edwards retired in March 2026, at the age of 75.

== Media ==
Edwards was featured prominently in the BBC series Pound Shop Wars.

Edwards also appeared in Saving Poundstretcher in 2018, where he attempted to overturn the retailer's trading difficulties, however, Poundstretcher would dismiss Edwards during the recording of the series, stating that he had implemented improvements the retailer had expected from him, and was no longer needed.
