= What Every Woman Wants =

What Every Woman Wants may refer to:

- What Every Woman Wants (1919 film), an American silent film
- What Every Woman Wants (1954 film), a British film directed by Maurice Elvey
- What Every Woman Wants (1962 film), a British film
- What Every Woman Wants (retail chain) - a Scottish chain of discount clothing stores which existed from 1972 to 1994
