= One Below (disambiguation) =

== Brands and enterprises ==
- OneBelow (Also written as "One Below"), the former name of a British variety store chain, now known as OneBeyond

== People ==
- One Be Lo or One Below, an American hip-hop rap artist
