= Goldbergs =

Former Scottish department store chain

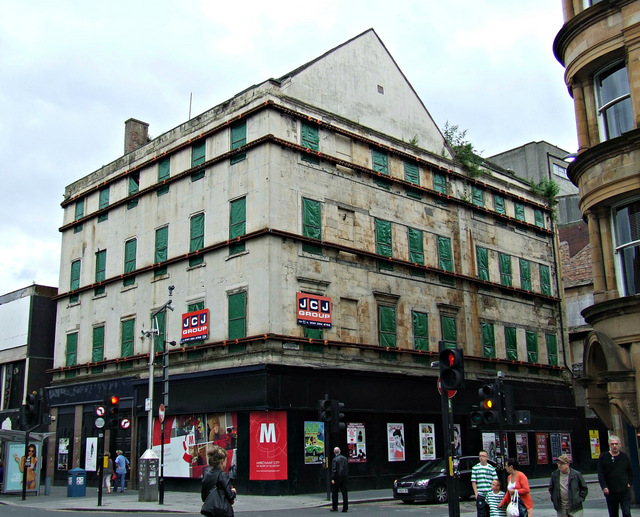
The remains of Goldbergs' flagship store in Glasgow in 2012, shortly before its demolition

A. Goldberg and Sons Ltd, which traded as Goldbergs, was a Scottish retail company which, prior to its demise in 1990, had grown from a single Glasgow store in 1908 to a chain of over 100 outlets. It was noted for its early introduction of an electronic point of sale (EPoS) system and its own in - house credit card. Its avant-garde Edinburgh store was noted for innovative features including a cafe on the top floor with a roof garden, escalators, a nursery and aviary.

== History ==
=== Founding of Goldbergs ===
A. Goldberg & Sons was founded in 1908 by Abraham Goldberg, a Jewish immigrant from Eastern Europe who had arrived in Glasgow via Dublin where he had married and where his first son was born. After starting a business on the South Side of Glasgow buying bales of cloth and making them up into goods for sale to wholesalers he moved to premises in Candleriggs in the 1920s.

Abraham Goldberg was chairman from 1908 to 1934, when he handed power to his two sons, Ephraim and Michael. Together they brought the company to the stock market and saw the development of the business from one department store in Glasgow to the building, by in-house contractors, of the Edinburgh department store in Tollcross. The building, which opened in 1963, was ahead of its time, with escalators and automatic doors and a facade featuring huge glass windows and copper statues. The store featured elaborate window displays, a rooftop restaurant with roof garden and views towards Edinburgh castle, a nursery, funfair and aviary filled with exotic birds to entertain children. The store was initially closed on Saturdays and open on Sundays in accordance with the observance of the Jewish Sabbath, however this changed after Abraham Goldberg's death. The store's ownership was no barrier to the mounting of impressive Christmas window displays, widely admired and remembered by the local population.

=== Scottish Expansion ===
From 1970 to 1974 a chain of stores were opened in Falkirk, Ayr, Paisley, Kirkcaldy, Motherwell, Dundee, Kilmarnock, Airdrie, Dunfermline, East Kilbride and Greenock, with an average salesfloor space of 7,500 sq ft (700 m^{2}). These sold a range of family fashions, household goods and electrical items.

From 1974 onwards Mark Goldberg, grandson of Abraham, took the position of chairman. At that time Goldbergs was the only Scottish public company with a woman director. Goldbergs was a quoted company from 1938 and always had a member of the Goldberg family at its head. By the mid-1980s it was one of only three Scottish-based retailers still quoted on the Stock Exchange.

=== 1980's Concessions and Expansion ===
Throughout the 1980s Goldberg expanded into England and Wales as well as further across Scotland. This was mostly through concessions other than the Goldberg brand itself. These included a womenswear chain of stores called Wrygges, a menswear alternative called Wrygges Man. Other locations included Virgo, Wardrobe and twentysomething.

During this decade Goldberg bought a 90% stake in the fledgling footwear company schuh, based in Edinburgh and Ted Baker.

=== 1990 Rebrand and Closure ===
After a disappointing 1989 Christmas festive trading period and several years of overexpansion, Goldberg tried to rebrand and consolidate. Several Goldberg department stores were closed, many of the Wrygges and Wrygges Man units were rebranded as 'News', which was a last ditch attempt to save the clothing concessions in collaboration with Jeff Banks. There was also a relaunch of Wrygges in London Oxford Street and Glasgow Union Street as 'ing', an innovative clothing store to appeal to a new generation of shoppers.

By summer 1990 Goldberg had fallen into administration and all units closed. The Ted Baker and schuh | Clothing for Feet brands were saved by their respective founders and relaunched later in 1990.

== Innovations in EPoS ==
In the mid-1970s the company became the first retailer in Europe to introduce a comprehensive electronic point of sale (EPoS) system (an IBM system that was in place until 1987). Until that time all sales transactions were recorded in day-books, an operation which involved having 500 bookkeepers. Not only was the process costly in terms of people employed, it also created large queues in the stores.

A visit to the US by some of the senior executives included discussions with Nat Solomon of the National Retailers Merchant Association. This visit was seen to be a critical one in that the company was seeking a survival strategy due to the increasing costs of the cash-taking system and declining profits.

Solomon's advice was to wait for IBM to develop a system. Other companies offering cash-taking equipment included Singer. However, Singer's system was an electro-mechanical one while IBM were developing a computerized one. IBM were instrumental in defining the needs of the Goldbergs business and the successful installation enabled IBM to enter the European market. At a stroke Goldbergs' labour costs went down and queues in the stores disappeared.

== Expansion ==
In 1979 the company launched Wrygges, a chain of young fashion stores targeted at the 15 to 24-year-old female. The late 1970s saw a one for three rights issue to fund this development, together with the expansion of the Goldberg department store chain with another three units (two in Scotland, and the first venture in England, in Blackpool). Goldberg's also owned Schuh, and a major stake in the Ted Baker fashion business.

== Stylecard ==
Goldbergs had its own in-house credit arrangements for its customers, based on three months' credit, plus a 5 per cent discount if the bill was settled at the end of three months. This offering was transformed into the Style credit card which benefited from the large customer base and the new EPoS system. Style was launched at the beginning of 1982 and followed the lines of other credit cards with no interest incurred for prompt monthly payment. Otherwise, minimum monthly payments could be made over a period of time while incurring interest charges.

Apart from the development of Style, investment continued with the leasing of 61,000 sq ft (5,700 m^{2}) of warehousing outside Glasgow to become a new central distribution depot.

By 1984, the Stylecard was being used not only in Goldbergs stores, but in a range of other non-fashion outlets such as Kwik-Fit and the travel agents A T Mays. Stylecard was eventually taken over by the Royal Bank of Scotland.

== Demise ==
Following a failed takeover bid by Blacks Leisure in 1989, Goldbergs went into receivership and ceased trading in 1990 having suffered losses of £10 million. The flagship Glasgow store on Candleriggs was acquired by entrepreneurs Vera and Gerald Weisfeld in 1994 and reopened as discount clothes store Weisfelds, a similar concept to their previous business What Everyone Wants. However, this closed in 1999 and the site subsequently fell into dereliction. The building was partially demolished in 2002 following the collapse of an adjacent tenement due to unstable foundations. The site was acquired by Selfridges, but plans for the company to build its first Scottish store on the site were shelved in 2007.

After much pressure from Glasgow City Council, Selfridges began demolition of the former Goldbergs buildings in late 2013, with interim plans to turn the site into a landscaped area in preparation for the 2014 Commonwealth Games. The proposals were formally abandoned in May 2014, when Selfridges sold the site to a private developer.

In September 2021, work began on the Candleriggs Square development, a mixed use scheme which will see housing, student accommodation and new retail units built on the footprint of the former Goldbergs building.
