= Alok Industries =

Indian textile manufacturer private limited

Alok Industries Limited
- Type: Public
- Traded as: BSE: 521070; NSE: ALOKTEXT
- Industry: Textiles; Real estate
- Founded: 1986; 40 years ago
- Founder: Surendra Jiwrajka
- Headquarters: Mumbai, Maharashtra, India
- Key people: Ram Rakesh Gaur (CEO); Vinod Sureka (CFO); Hitesh Kanani (Company Secretary)
- Revenue: ▲₹5,356 crore (US$560 million) (2024)
- Operating income: ▲₹66 crore (US$6.9 million) (2024)
- Net income: ▲₹−814 crore (US$−85 million) (2024)
- Total assets: ▼₹7,934.54 crore (US$820 million) (2022)
- Total equity: ▲₹496.53 crore (US$52 million) (2022)
- Owner: Reliance Industries (40.01%) JM Financial Asset Reconstruction Company Limited (34.99%)
- Number of employees: 26231 (2022)
- Parent: Reliance Industries
- Subsidiaries: Alok Infrastructure Limited; Alok Worldwide Limited; Alok International (Middle East) FZE; Alok Singapore Pte Limited; Alok International Inc; Alok Global Trading (Middle East) FZE (business license cancelled on 12 September 2017); Mileta a.s
- Rating: CARE AA (CE)
- Website: www.alokind.com

Alok Industries Limited is an Indian textile manufacturing company based in Mumbai. It is owned by Reliance Industries. Alok Industries Limited has five core divisions: Home Textiles, Cotton Yarn, Apparel Fabric, Garments, Technical Textiles, Textile Accessories and Polyester Yarn. Its main business involves weaving, knitting, processing, home textiles, ready made garments and polyester yarns. It exports 26% of its products to over 90 countries, including the United States as well as countries in Europe, South America, Asia and Africa. Alok Industries also has a majority stake in a textile company called Mileta, which is incorporated in the Czech Republic and supplies its products across Europe. Export represents 90% of the entire production.

== History ==
Founded in 1986 as a private limited company. In 1989, the inauguration of Their first polyester texturizing plant marked a significant milestone, By 1993, They had transitioned into a public limited company.

Over the decades, They have diversified into weaving, knitting, processing, home textiles, and garments.

== Retail ==
Alok Industries has shutdown all its direct retail stores (Store 21, H&A). However, they have started selling Some Of their products On Their parent Reliance backed Ajio And Amazon. They Also Supply Their Products To Reliance Retail

== Financials ==
As per the latest Annual Report (2022), total sales of the Company increased by 91.44% to Rs. 7,150.91 crore from Rs. 3,735.31 crore in the previous year. Domestic sales increased by 96.22% to Rs. 5,451.37 crore from Rs. 2,778.11 crore in the previous year. Export sales increased by 77.55% to Rs. 1,699.54 crore from Rs. 957.20 crore in previous year. Operating EBITDA (before exceptional items) was positive at Rs. 611.61 crore as compared to negative EBITDA (before exceptional items) of Rs. 432.63 crore in the previous year. Operating Profit Before Tax (PBT) (before exceptional items) was negative at Rs. 184.18 crore as compared to negative PBT (before exceptional items) of Rs. 1,190.78 crore in the previous year.

Alok’s export business has increased to Rs. 1699.54 crore in the current year as against Rs. 957.20 crore in the previous period representing growth of 77.55%.

== Share Holding ==
Reliance Industries holds a 40.01% stake in Alok, while JM Financial (acting as PAC with RIL), through its subsidiary, holds a 35% Stake in Alok. Reliance Industries also have 9% optionally convertible preference shares and Non Convertible redeemable preference shares worth 3300 crores. This makes Alok a subsidiary of Reliance.

The paid-up Share Capital of the Company as on 31 March 2022 was 496.52 crore shares of Rs. 1/- each.
