= Candleriggs =

Street in Glasgow, Scotland

Coordinates: 55.85804°N 4.24585°W

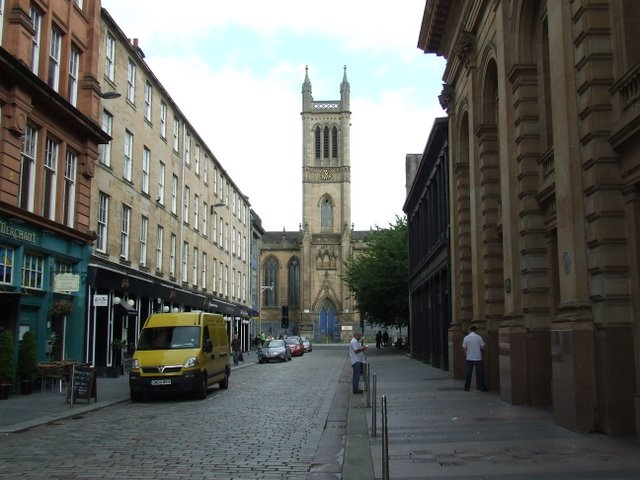
View along Candleriggs with the Ramshorn Theatre in the distance

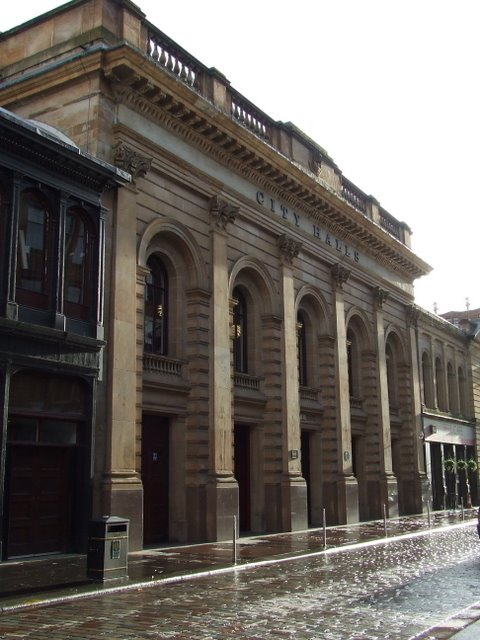
The City Halls on Candleriggs

Candleriggs is a street in the city of Glasgow, Scotland. It is located in the Merchant City area of the city centre.

Candleriggs was historically the area of the old city of Glasgow where candlemakers plied their trade, at a safe distance from the crowded tenements clustered around the High Street. As the city expanded in the eighteenth century it became a thriving thoroughfare itself, lined with tenements and businesses typical of Glasgow at that time.

Looking down Candleriggs from its northern junction with Ingram Street, stands St David's, later known as Ramshorn Kirk. It had been without a congregation for a long while before being purchased by the University of Strathclyde in 1982. The church dates from 1826, built in Gothic Revival style by an English architect, Thomas Rickman, whose plans featured the large central tower which dominates the structure. It now serves as the home for the University of Strathclyde's Confucius Institute for Scotlands Schools and Scotland's National Centre for Languages.

Candleriggs is perhaps best known as the site of the City Halls, a musical venue operated by Glasgow City Council, home to the BBC Scottish Symphony Orchestra and a regular Glasgow performance base for the Scottish Chamber Orchestra. It is the older purpose-built concert hall in Glasgow.

The old Candleriggs Fruit Market building at the corner of Candleriggs and Bell Street housed a market for many years. With the opening of a purpose-built facility in May 1969, on the site of the old Blochairn Steelworks, it closed and was redeveloped as a complex housing pubs and restaurants which was renamed "Merchant Square".

Towards the southern end of Candleriggs was the Goldbergs department store, which closed in 1991. It was then taken over by Vera Weisfeld (of What Every Woman Wants fame) and reopened in 1994 as Weisfelds - a budget clothing store. Weisfeld's closed in 1999.

Granny Black's was a well known pub on Candleriggs housed in an old tenement building which collapsed due to a burst water main in the basement one night in February 2002. The building was empty at the time of the incident and there were no reported injuries.

The site subsequently fell into dereliction and the land was acquired by the luxury retailer Selfridges of London, although their plans to build a department store there were later dropped. In late 2013, Selfridges began demolition of the former Goldbergs buildings and works began in early 2014 to landscape the area. Following Selfridges selling land to a property developer, approval was granted in May 2020 for mixed-use development of the site by Drum Property. The first phase of the development will include a 500-room hotel and 300 apartments and is currently under construction.
