= Poundstretcher =

British variety retailer

Poundstretcher Limited
- Logo used since 2024

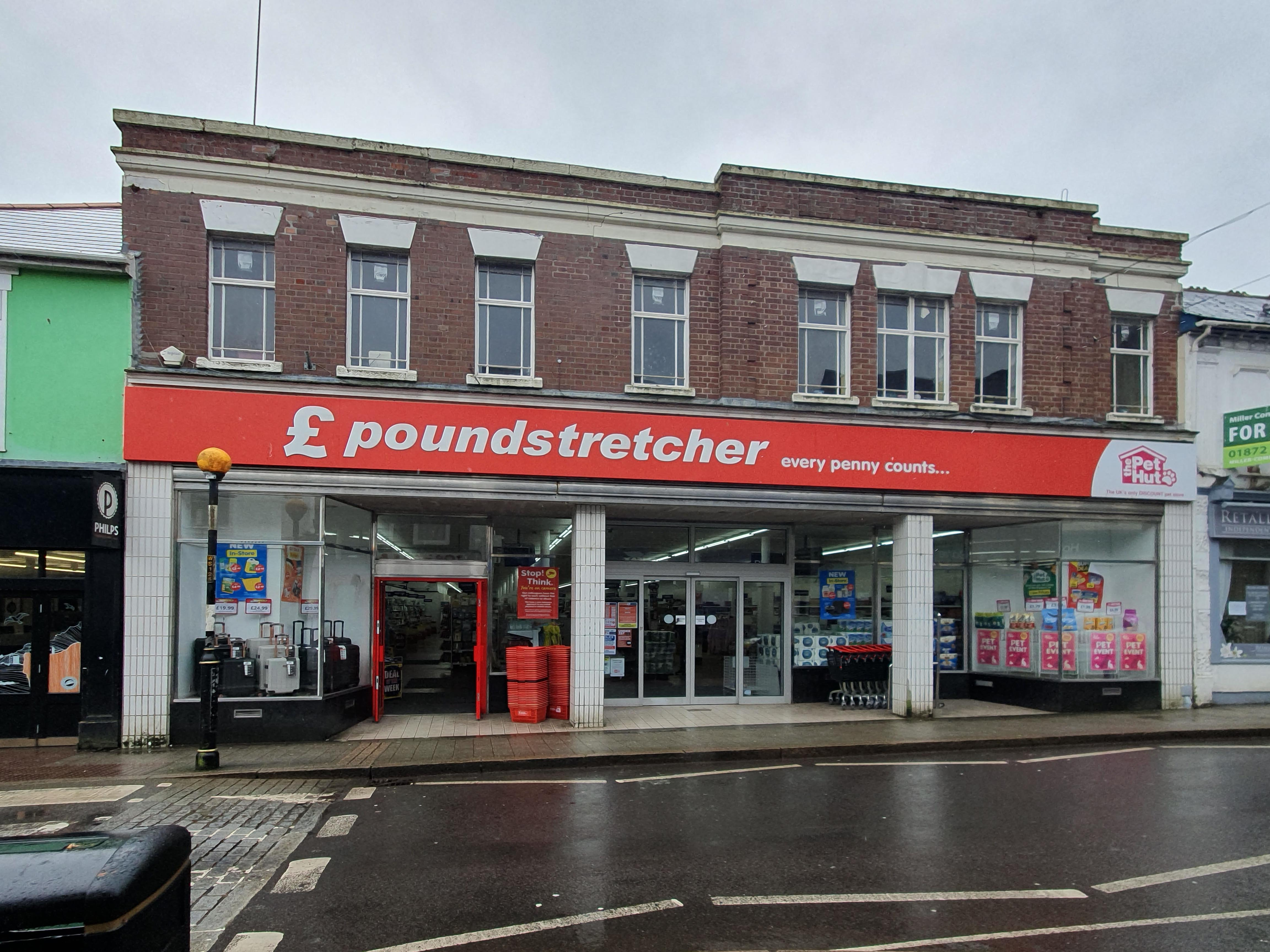
- A shop in Cornwall
- Type: Private (Subsidiary)
- Industry: Retail
- Founded: 1981; 45 years ago
- Founders: Paul Appell; Stephen Fearnley
- Headquarters: Kirby Muxloe, England, UK
- Number of locations: 324 (as of March 2023)
- Key people: Andy Atkinson (CEO); Tristan Phillips (CFO)
- Products: Groceries; Consumer goods; Garden and leisure; Pet supplies; Stationery; Toiletries; DIY
- Owner: Fortress Investment Group
- Subsidiaries: Bargain Buys
- Website: poundstretcher.co.uk

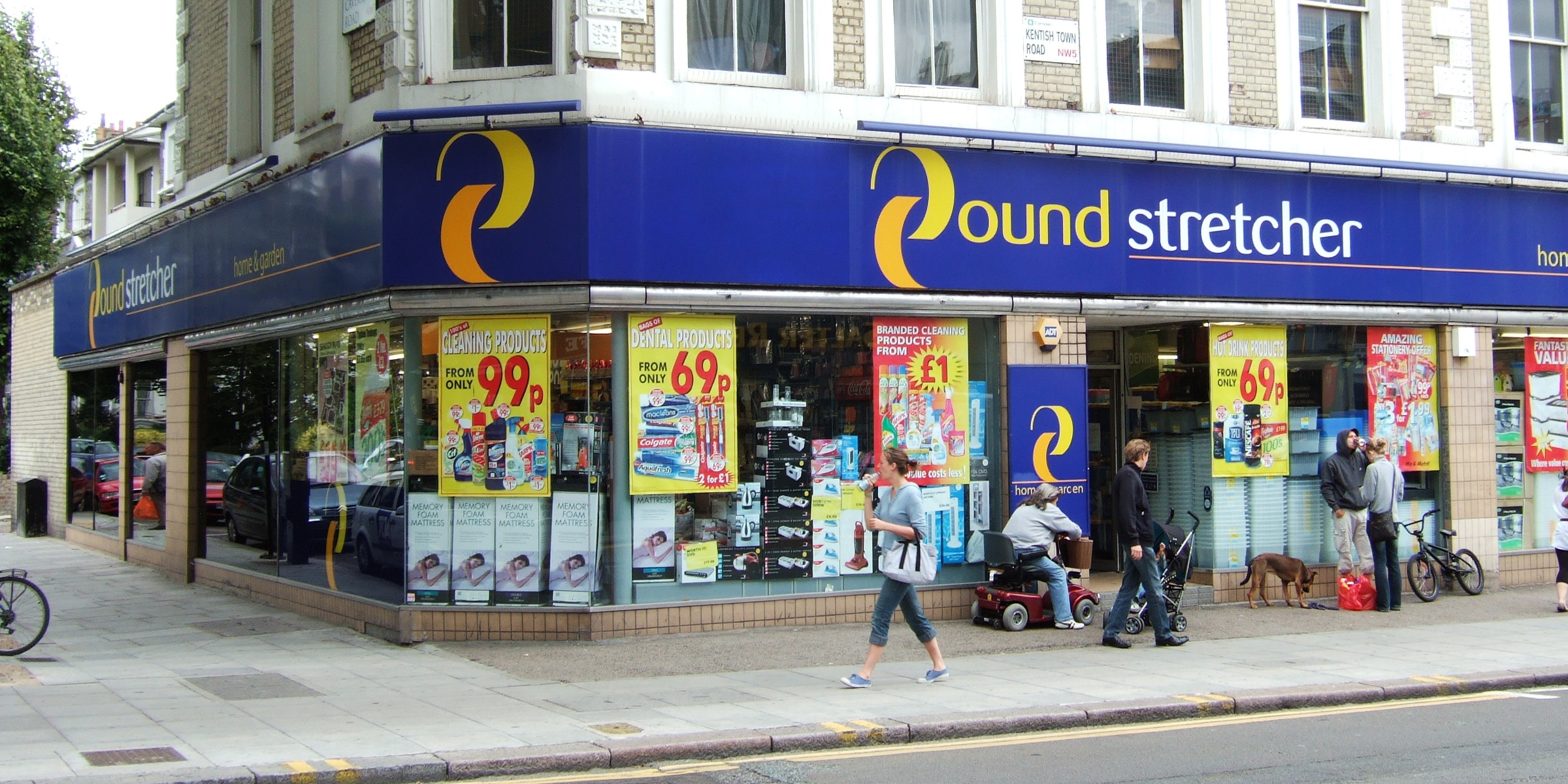
Poundstretcher in Kentish Town, London, showing a blue shopfront with a different logo

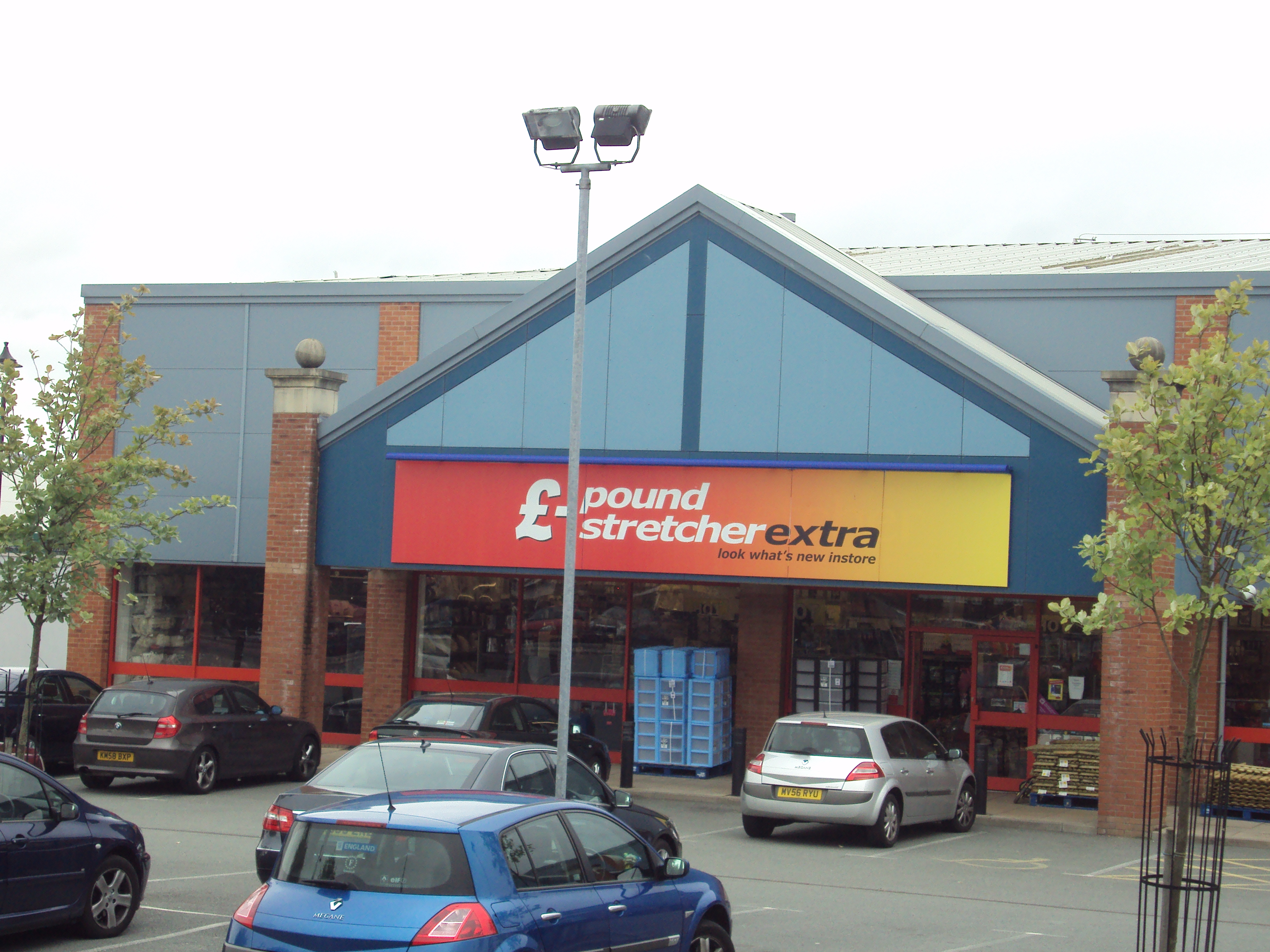
An example of a location operating a larger format in 2010 as 'Poundstretcher Extra'. This format would later be replaced by the Bargain Buys brand.

Poundstretcher Limited is a British variety store chain, founded in 1981 by Paul Appell and Stephen Fearnley.

In March 1989, Brown & Jackson plc acquired Poundstretcher, and in September 2003, announced that some Poundstretcher locations would be gradually converted into their new Instore format. In February 2006, it was announced that Instore had issued a profit warning, and in February 2009, a programme to convert all Instore locations to Poundstretcher began.

In March 2009, Aziz Tayub would increase his shareholding to become the majority owner of Poundstretcher, becoming the ultimate owner by March 2012. In September 2018, Poundstretcher began opening new stores under the Bargain Buys fascia, and later converting its larger-format Poundstretcher stores to Bargain Buys. In April 2024, Poundstretcher was sold to Fortress Investment Group.

On 12 June 2026, Justice Hildyard of the High Court approved a restructuring of Poundstretcher, with concerns that the business was in serious financial difficulty and that their recovery plan lacked detail. However, Hildyard decided that there was a realistic prospect of the restructuring succeeding.

== History ==
Poundstretcher was established in 1981 by Paul Appell and Stephen Fearnley. It became a subsidiary of Brown & Jackson plc (originally a construction firm which can be traced back to 1923) in March 1989.

After selling Poundstretcher to Philip Harris, founders Paul Appell and Stephen Fearnley acquired control of a failing retail business, United News Shops, which they managed to revitalise. In March 2008, United News Shops was sold to WHSmith.

In 1995 Pepkor, South Africa's largest retailer, acquired a controlling stake in Brown & Jackson plc and refinanced it. Brown & Jackson expanded rapidly with What Everyone Wants and Your More Stores purchased in October 1997 and The Brunswick Warehouse in January 2000. During 2000 the group continued to expand organically, including its first overseas venture with the opening of six stores in Poland.

During 2002 the group embarked on a major restructuring. The board undertook to dispose of the trading subsidiaries other than Poundstretcher Ltd and this disposal was completed on 27 September 2002. In 2003 the company undertook a rebrand of company name to Instore. Poundstretcher stores were gradually being rebranded to ...instore, however in 2006, a new chief executive concluded that the rebranding was not working, and from June 2009, new stores were opened as Poundstretcher after Instore plc was acquired by Aziz Tayub. In September 2012, the group had 400 stores in the United Kingdom.

In May 2011, the company bought Alworths. On 6 February 2012, Poundstretcher acquired 20 stores from the UGO chain, after it was placed in administration. In April 2012, Poundstretcher opened a store at Madina Mall, Dubai, United Arab Emirates, the first outside the United Kingdom since the 2002 disposal of B&J Poland. In September 2012, it was announced that out of the 20 stores that were acquired, 14 were to close, and the remaining 6 most profitable outlets would remain as part of the group.

In 2018, after Poundworld was shut down, Poundstretcher began to open former stores under the Bargain Buys brand name, which was previously used by the former company. The trademark for Bargain Buys was claimed by Poundstretcher.

In August 2018, Channel 4 broadcast Saving Poundstretcher which focused on former Poundworld owner Chris Edwards's attempts to revitalise the chain. Edwards was dismissed from his role at the retailer by owner Aziz Tayub during the series, which attracted criticism from viewers.

In June 2020, the retailer explored the possibility of a company voluntary arrangement due to financial difficulties. It would achieve large profit increases in the following year.

In September 2023, the retailer began looking at acquiring Wilko locations, following the chain's administration. In December, Tristan Phillips, the former head of finance at Marks & Spencer, was promoted to be the retailer's chief executive.

In April 2024, Aziz Tayub sold Poundstretcher to Fortress Investment Group.

In May 2026, it was announced that the Poundstretcher and Bargain Buys chains would face administration if a restructuring deal was not approved, affecting around 300 stores and 3,000 members of staff. The restructuring deal was approved in June 2026, with 93% of creditors supporting it, and landlords accepting rent reductions.

== See also ==
- Bargain Buys
- B&M
- Home Bargains
