= 99p Stores =

British discount store chain

99p Stores Ltd.
- Type: Private Limited Company
- Industry: Retail
- Founded: Holloway, London, United Kingdom (18 January 2001)
- Founder: Nadir Lalani
- Defunct: 6 March 2016
- Successor: Poundland
- Headquarters: Northamptonshire, United Kingdom
- Number of locations: 220+
- Key people: Simon Barnett ( Director)
- Products: Groceries, Consumer goods, Do it yourself, electrical
- Number of employees: 3000+
- Parent: Poundland
- Subsidiaries: Family Bargains
- Website: 99p-stores.co.uk

99p Stores Ltd. was a family-run business founded in January 2001 by entrepreneur Nadir Lalani, who opened the first store in the chain in Holloway, London, with a further three stores opening later that year. In 2002, Lalani decided to expand the business throughout the UK and had rapidly developed 99p Stores, operating a total of 129 stores as of March 2010 and serving around 1.5 million customers each week, undercutting their main rival Poundland by a penny. As of mid-2009, the company offered more than 3,500 different product lines throughout its stores.

Most of their stores were based in the south of the UK, although, there were stores as far north as Liverpool and Hartlepool. The chain saw accelerated store expansion upon the collapse of Woolworths Group, where they took the opportunity to acquire 15 of these former stores, increasing their estate to 79 at that time. Landlords were regarding 99p Stores as an anchor tenant due to the significant number of customers one of their stores could bring to a location.

Although the retailer made a pre-tax loss of £1.14 million in the year to 31 January 2007, they claimed that, since then, consumers had become more cautious with their money and where they spend it, in response to the 2008 financial crisis. The retailer had noticed an increase of customers from the wealthier AB social grade (a system of demographic classification used in the United Kingdom) during the recession. Customers had tended to speak positively about 99p Stores, with most reviewers noting customer and product overcrowding as their biggest criticisms, yet still rated the chain 4.5/5 on average.

In February 2015, Poundland agreed to buy 99p Stores for £55 million, with regulatory approval received in September 2015. The 99p Stores fascia began being phased out in favour of Poundland branding from late 2015.

== History ==
=== Foundation ===
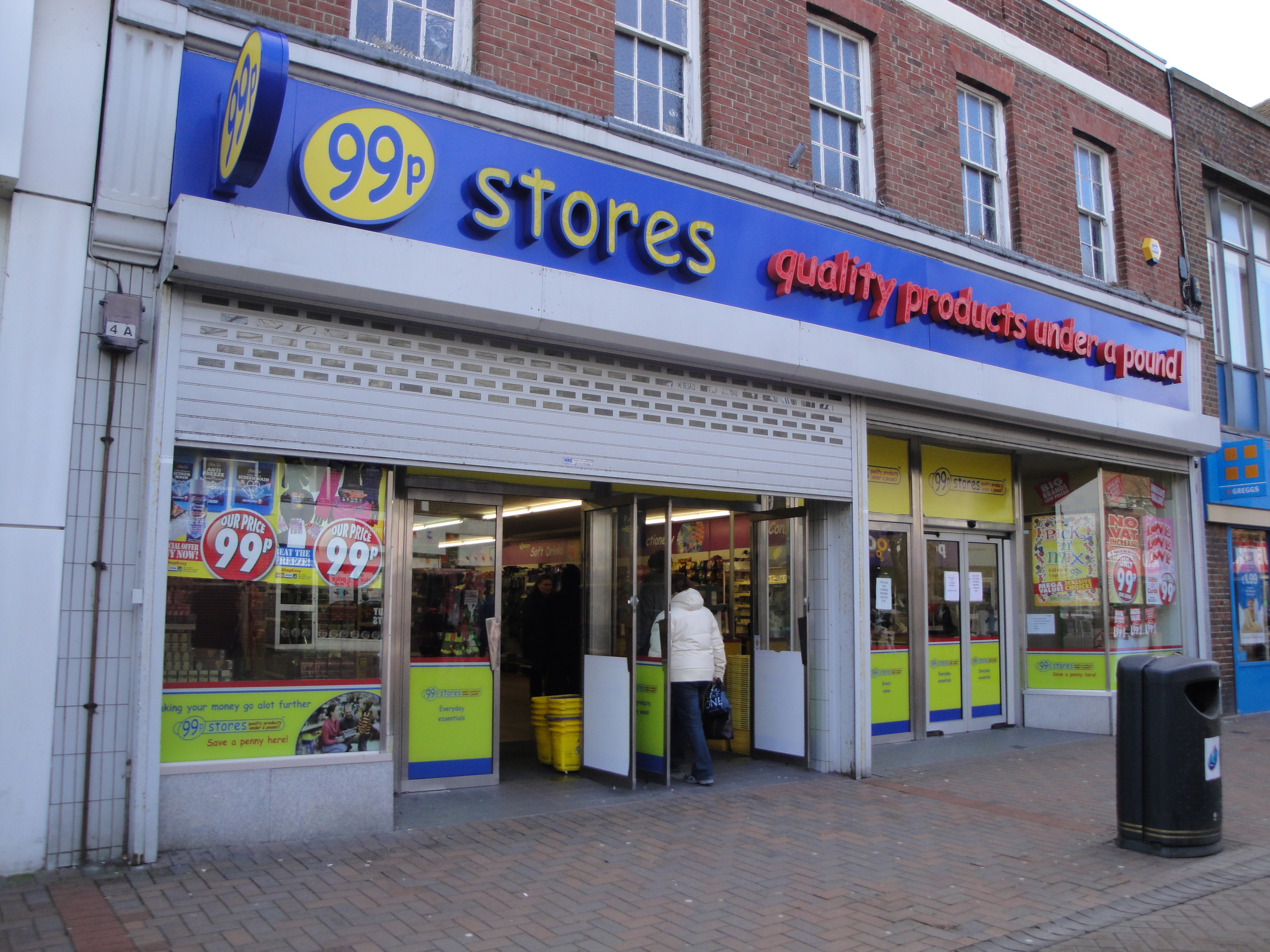
99p Store in Gosport

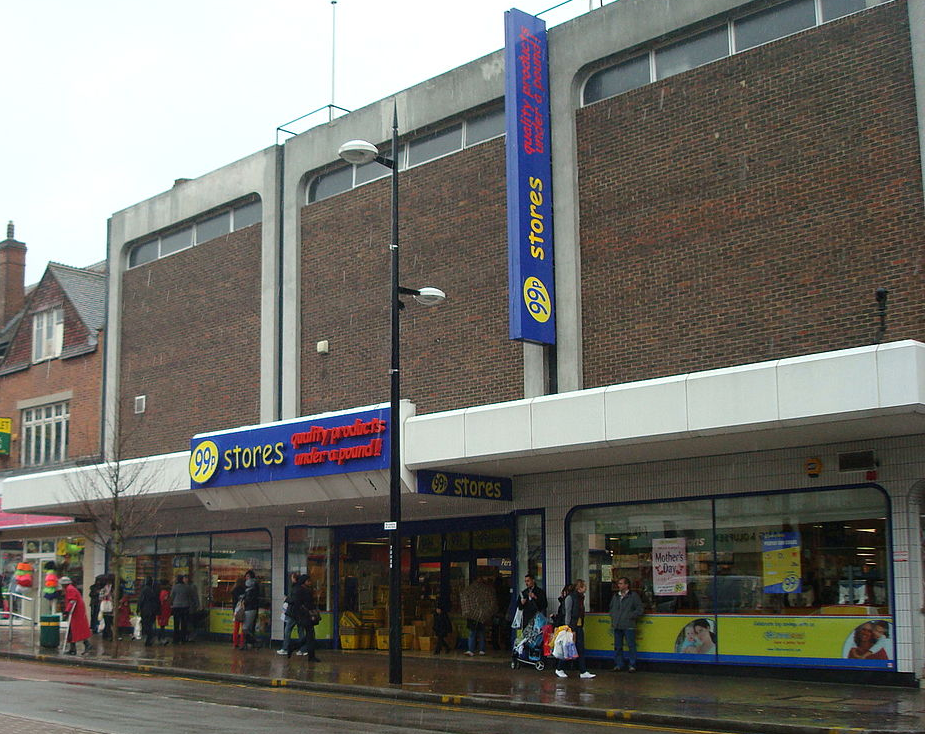
99p Store in Bromley

Nadir Lalani came to the UK in 1973 from Tanzania, having owned a cash and carry store in Mwanza. Since moving to the UK, he built up and sold two convenience store chains (including buying Whistlestop Discount Stores, a 27-strong chain which he sold in 2005) before moving into discount retailing, with intentions of handing the business over to his two sons, who also worked for the company, in due course. Lalani was inspired to start 99p Stores after stumbling upon a bustling Poundland shop whilst wandering around a shopping centre. His first store opened on 18 January 2001, with over 3,500 customers visiting the store in the first day of trading. As of mid-2009, the company offered more than 3,500 different product lines throughout its stores.

=== Growth ===
The company relocated their headquarters to a new, 150,000 square feet (14,000 m^{2}) base in Daventry in 2007, giving them capacity to go to 120 stores with existing infrastructure. Discount shops, including 99p Stores, had seen store numbers increase by 60% during the economic downturn, with two discount stores opening for every one store that has closed. The retailer took advantage of the tough economic climate of the late 2000s, having doubled the number of their stores during the period August 2008 - August 2009, and had further plans to double existing store numbers and current market share within the 18 months following October 2009.

In August 2009, Retail Week reported that the retailer was to review its ownership structure, potentially resulting in a sale as early as summer 2010 or a flotation within the next three years. The retailer had said they would want 150 shops before considering any offers to buy a stake in the business, mentioning the advantages of a flotation to include further investment, as well as the Lalani family being able to retain a stake and an element of control in the business.

=== Management ===
In October 2009, the retailer appointed Gordon Brown as their new chairman, who took up the position on 1 October 2009, taking over from Peter Gent. Brown, having previously served as managing director at Wilkinson between 1991 and 2007, joined the company at a time when it was embarking on aggressive expansion and assessing its long-term options.

== Business practice ==
=== Sales strategy ===
When inflation pushes up prices beyond what the company is willing to pay, this is often easily worked around by reducing the quantity supplied in each item, for example by reducing the amount of tape on reels of selotape, or selling eggs by the dozen instead of 18s. Nadir's son and buying director, Faisal, who took care of the day-to-day running, noted that the lowest margin he could work with was 20 percent. In response to the planned VAT rise to 20% in January 2011, the budget chain said it would not change its prices but would stop selling goods that did not make a profit.

=== Products offered ===
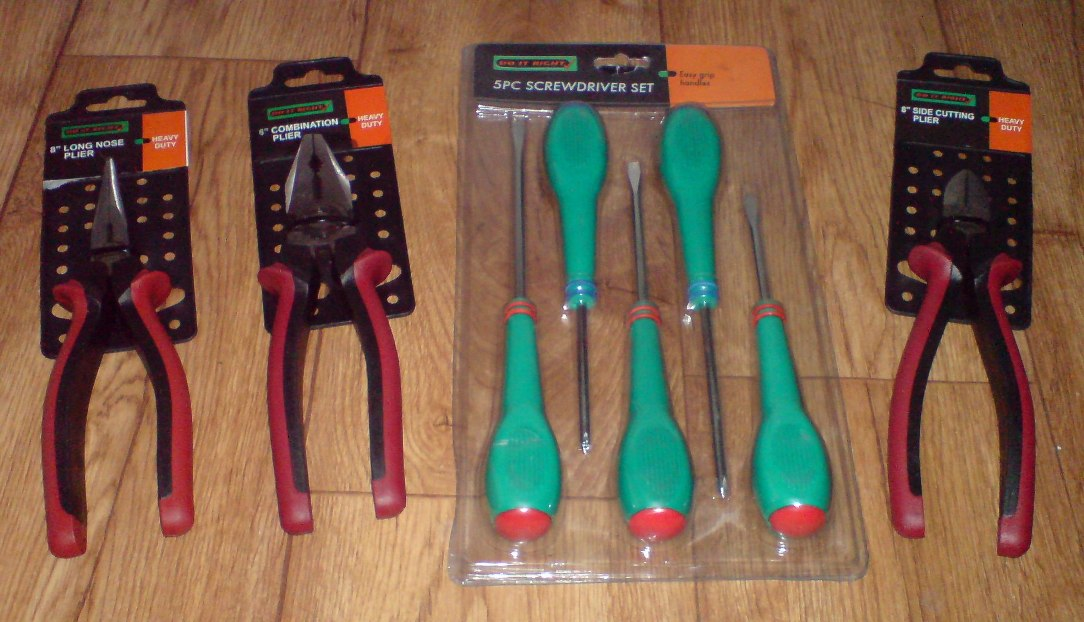
Selection of own brand "Do It Right" DIY tools

The retailer offered a large range of products in its 3,500 lines, from "do it yourself" (DIY) and electrical to toys and stationery products, with around 60% of their products consisting of well-known brands such as Colgate, Pepsi and Pringles. Plans had been announced to extend its grocery offerings, which made up 35% of its 3,500 lines. Food products had been a strong performer for the retailer, accounting for 40% of total sales in April 2008, which itself was an increase of 5% from the start of 2008. The retailer provided its own line of grocery products, branded 'Deli Fresh', which were launched at the start of 2007. As of 2006, the retailer was making a profit margin of 40% on the produce it sold, which included its most popular food lines at that time such as potatoes, onions, and eggs. Some products had sold for less than 99p, such as branded cakes for 69p and 2-litre (1.8 imp qt) bottles of soft drinks for 89p. The best seller was the 250-gram (8.8 oz) Galaxy chocolate bar.

The business sourced a third of its products from the Far East, allowing for gross margins of up to 50%.

=== Store expansion ===
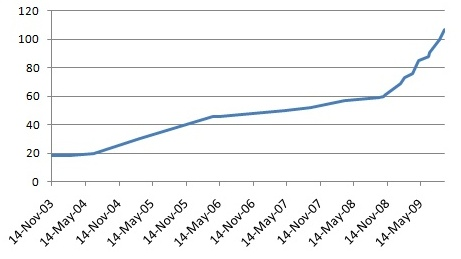
Growth of 99p Stores from 2003 to 2009

In April 2006, the retailer secured an £8 million cash injection from its venture capital backers Barclays Ventures and Lloyds TSB to open up to 45 new stores by early 2008. More than two years later, in September 2008, its 59th store was opened in Bracknell, Berkshire and by the end of 2008, there were 65 stores open, with plans for 20 stores each year over the next three years.

As can be seen in the graph to the right, the retailer had seen rapid growth since the end of 2008, doubling the number of their stores from 61 in November 2008 to 123 in December 2009. Company owner Lalani said that finding sites was getting easier because of the new empty rate tax on commercial property. Whereas, previously, landlords would decline to have a discount shop filling their empty stores, they were less reluctant to fill them with discount stores, as they were being charged for stores which lie empty. Stuart Donnelly, head of property at 99p Stores, noted that landlords were being much more proactive, inviting potential retailers to come and have a look at their locations with the hope of them taking up a lease, as the property market has been badly affected by the recession, allowing the company to drive competitive deals to further expand their portfolio of stores with less expenditure, something that wouldn't have been possible just a few years previously. Landlords were regarding 99p Stores as an anchor tenant due to the significant number of customers one of their stores can bring to a location.

Upon the collapse of the former Woolworths Group, 99p Stores took the opportunity to acquire 15 of the vacant stores, increasing their estate to 79. They reached 100 stores in August 2009 and, as of December 2009, the retail chain had acquired and reopened 52 former Woolworths stores. New store openings had proved so popular that bosses had been requesting friendly police presence for crowd control purposes for desperate shoppers who queued from 5am to be the first to get hold of first-customer bargains.

=== Family Bargains ===
In 2010, the owners of 99p Stores launched a subsidiary chain, Family Bargains. The first store opened in Carmarthen, Wales. The new chain was intended to operate from larger store sites, such as retail parks, and aimed to sell a wider range of products, with the benefit of not being tied to a single price-point as in the 99p Stores. The Carmarthen, Wales, Family Bargains store reverted to the 99p Stores branding in February 2012.

== Customer base ==
A 2009 survey by the store revealed some of its 600,000 weekly customers were stockbrokers, solicitors, accountants, and doctors, as opposed to an overwhelming majority of hard-up and poorly paid people. The retailer had noticed a lot more consumers from the AB social grade in their stores, and were expecting this trend to continue even after the economy recovered.

Some stores, such as one located in the seaside town of Clacton, were well positioned to attract a lot of passing tourists. In August 2009, the Clacton store was reporting more than 5,000 customers per day, with sometimes as many as 400 customers passing through their doors every hour, and often clearing out most of the store's stock daily.

== Competition ==
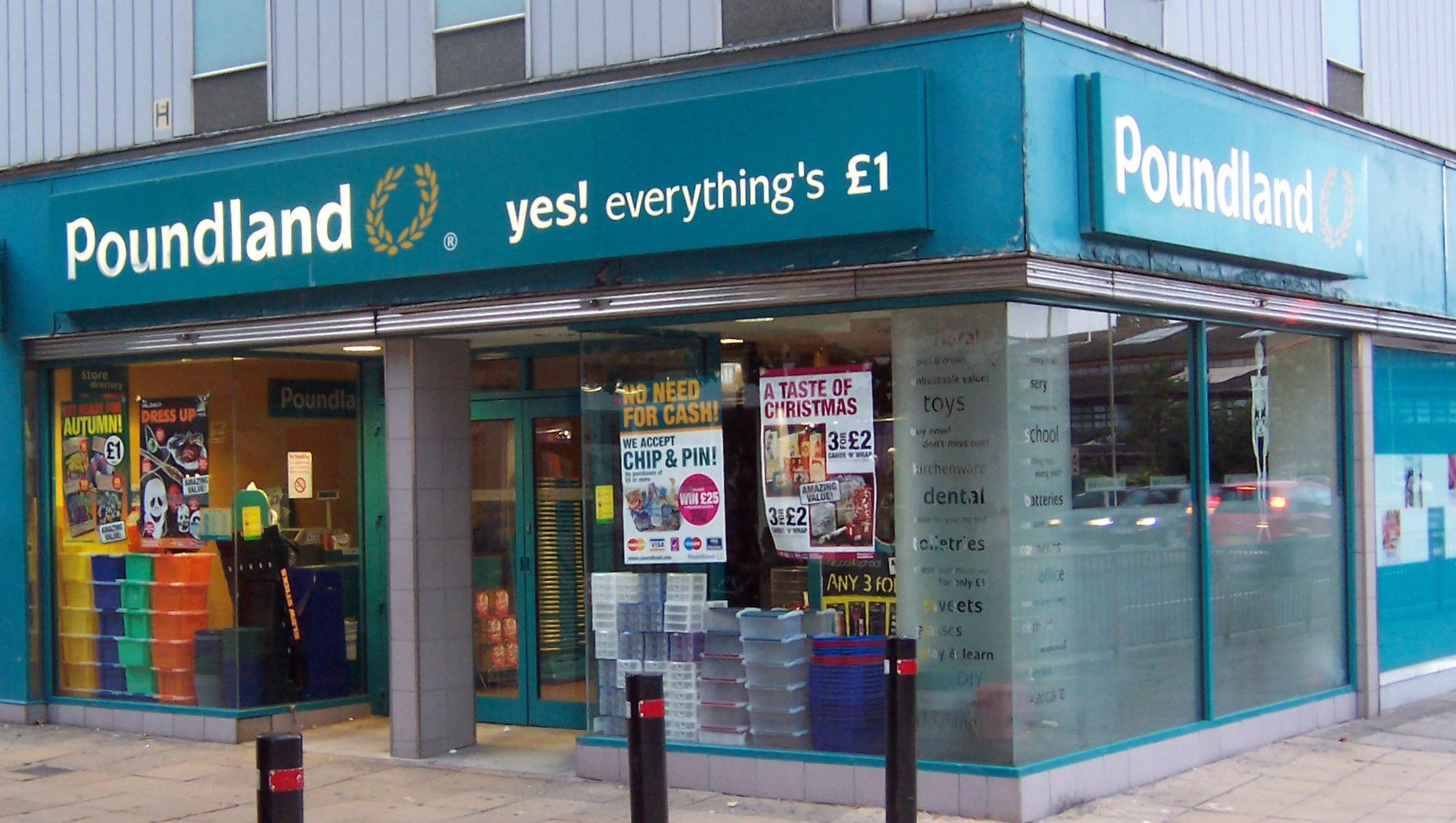
Poundland was 99p Stores' closest rival and competitor in the price-point retail sector until 2015.

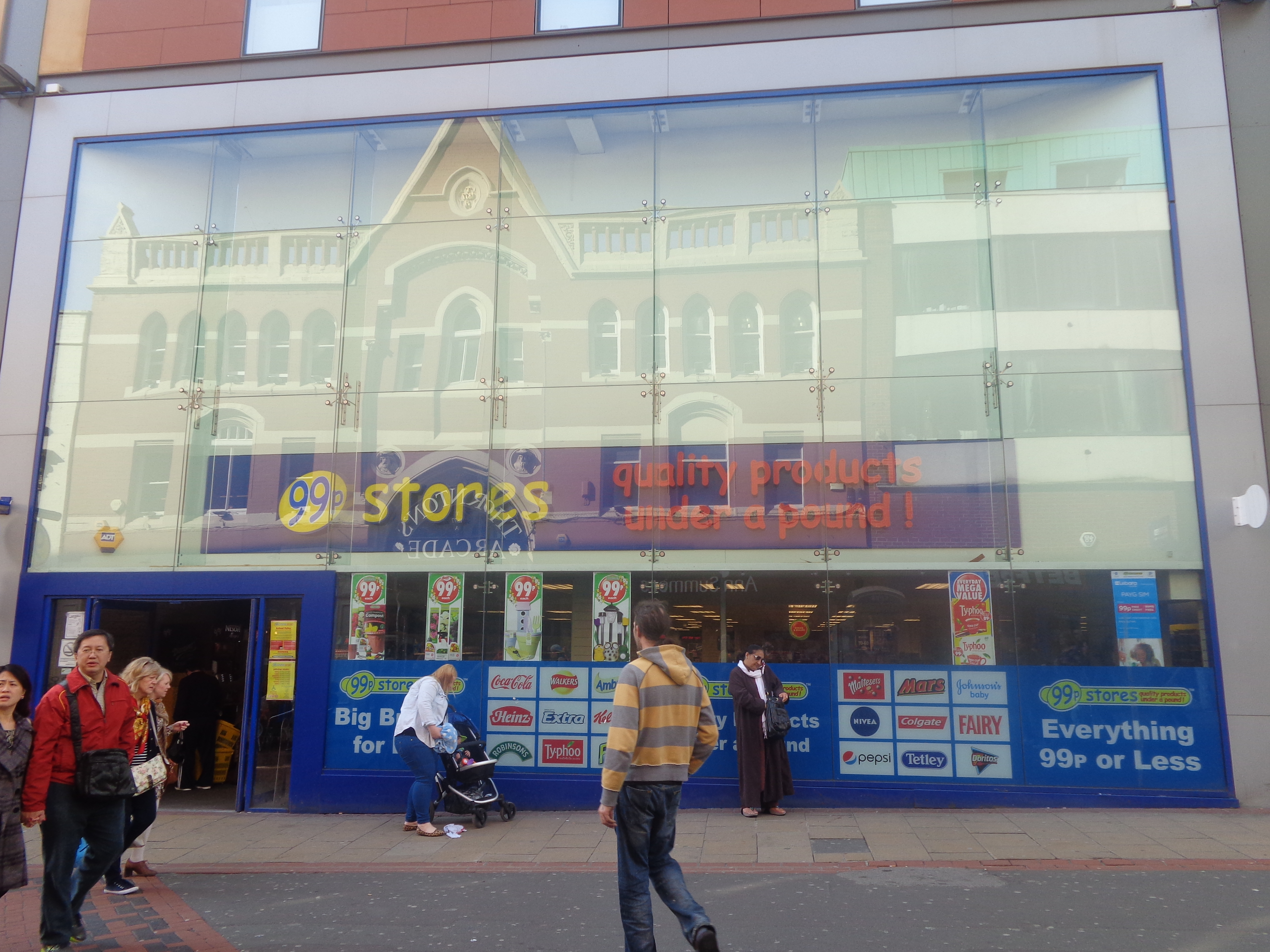
99p Stores on Lands Lane in Leeds in 2015. This is now a branch of Poundland.

=== Competitive strategy ===
Value and discount retailers had seen a boom in sales since the recession at the start of 2009. Although there were several retailers with the same strategy as 99p Stores, such as independent businesses and smaller price-point retail chains such as Poundworld, 99p Stores' closest and largest rival in the sector was Poundland. The retailer had cited one of their main aims was to catch up with Poundland and their 223 stores as of August 2009. The retailer made it a point of honour to undercut rival Poundland, whose £1 pack of 100 white plastic cups contained 20 fewer (and cost a penny more) than the pack of 120 available at 99p Stores as of late 2007.

=== Direct competition ===
In June 2009, a traditional sweet shop in Petersfield came under serious threat of closure following the opening of a 99p Store, with takings going down by as much as 60 percent a day. They were struggling to attract customers as the 99p Store is able to sell a similar range of sweets from its confectionery counter at a fraction of the price, as being a multimillion-pound concern it was able to increase its lines and buy larger quantities at cheaper prices. The commercial manager of 99p Stores, Gerry Loughran, noted that "she was obviously trading when Woolworths was open, and they had the biggest pick and mix operation in the UK at the time, so she has faced competition before and she was able to manage then."

In December 2009, Eastleigh news reported that a new discount shop had established itself next door to a 99p Stores outlet, but instead selling all its products for 89p, undercutting the retailer by 10p. This was a new experience for the 99p Stores outlet in Eastleigh, as, when they first opened, they succeeded in undercutting the two existing discount stores, "The Stockmarket" and "T.M Stores", to the extent that both shops closed down within months. The manager of the new 89p shop disagreed that this a business model which can only succeed in a recession, stating "this is a business for any time, people love value for money". The 89p shop was the 2nd branch to be opened, the first being in Poole, Dorset.

== Financial performance ==
The retailer had boasted rapid growth since interception which it attributed to their strong sales growth. As a result of their growth, they were rated in the Sunday Times Fast Track 100 in December 2006 as the 19th fastest growing company in the country. The Grocer also ranked them 11th in their Top 50 list of independent grocery retailers.

Week ending	Turnover (£m)	Gross profit (£m)	Profit/(loss) before tax (£m)
31 January 2010	183.5		1.79
31 January 2009	113		0.333
31 January 2008	94	18.9	0.143
31 January 2007	80.8	16	(1.14)

== Litigation ==
=== Health and safety ===
In June 2005, the retailer received fines and costs totalling almost £4,400 after pleading guilty at Barnsley Magistrates' Court of supplying dangerous frying pans. A unit purchased by trading standards and informally tested was found to fail on the handle strength and it became too hot to touch. The company immediately displayed recall notices upon learning of the dangerous product.

The company again were fined on 17 October 2005, after pleading guilty at Kingston Magistrates' Court to selling hair removal cream, which had no instructions in English and caused burning to the consumers' skin when applied. The company were fined £2,500 and had to pay Kingston Council's costs of £500. They were criticised for not having procedures in place to ensure the safety of items, however, agreed to introduce procedures to ensure that such instances could not occur again.

=== Product sale to underaged customer ===
The company were also fined £3,000 in February 2006, after staff in their Acton and West Ealing stores were caught selling adult-rated DVD films to a 15-year-old boy during a council sting operation. Ealing Trading Standards Officers sent in the boy to establish whether the retailer would sell to youths trying to purchase age-restricted goods. Mr Rosewarne, the health and safety officer for the company, gave evidence on how seriously the company had taken the matter and gave details on new procedures for staff training and in store publicity to avoid any reoccurrences.

=== Harassment on the grounds of race, discrimination on the grounds of gender ===
In July 2015, a Polish woman in the Dublin branch was awarded €55,000 after a judgement by the Equality Tribunal. She had been expected to work 70 hours a week while heavily pregnant, and had been promoted to a 'trainee manager' position, meaning she was not paid overtime. The tribunal found that she was the de facto manager of the store.

== Customer perception ==
Generally, customers spoke positively about 99p Stores, with most reviewers only criticising customer and product overcrowding, as well as a lack of cleanliness in many of their stores. Some reviewers noted that they had seen several items cheaper from other retailers; however, mostly the products on offer at 99p Stores were of good value. Reviews on dooyoo.co.uk (a shopping advice and review site) showed an average rating of 4/5. Upon opening one of their stores at Muswell Hill, customers were commenting how they had wanted a shop like 99p Stores for some time, with very strong sales reported for their first day of trading.

== Awards and nominations ==
In January 2013, 99p Stores was nominated for the Business of the Year award at the British Muslim Awards.

== See also ==
- Variety store
- Pound Shop Wars
