= Alworths =

Former chain of 18 high-street retail stores

- Logo 2009–2011

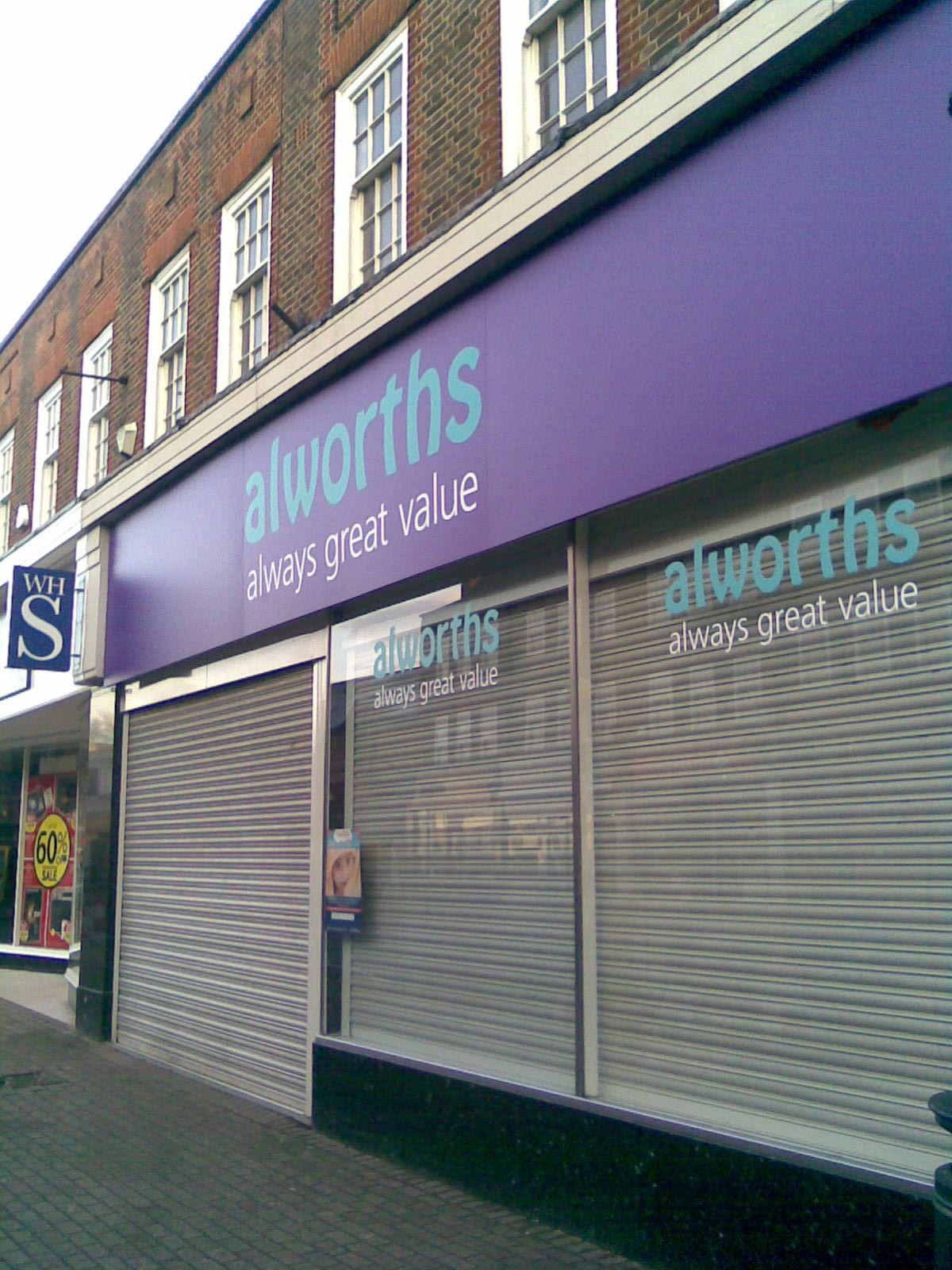
- Alworths storefront in place of a previous Woolworths store, April 2010
- Type: Limited company
- Industry: Retail and distribution
- Predecessor: Woolworths
- Founded: 2009; 17 years ago
- Founder: Andy Latham
- Defunct: 2011; 15 years ago
- Fate: Administration
- Successor: Woolworths.co.uk
- Headquarters: Redhill, Surrey, England
- Area served: UK
- Key people: Andy Latham
- Products: General merchandise
- Parent: Poundstretcher

Alworths was a chain of 18 high-street retail stores created in 2009 out of some of the former stores of Woolworths plc in the United Kingdom. The new company entered administration in 2011, and 15 branches were acquired by Poundstretcher.

== History ==
At the end of 2008 Woolworths Plc, the parent company of the Woolworths stores, was in financial trouble, and went into administration at the beginning of 2009. All of the Woolworths high street stores in Britain were then closed. During the demise of the company, Tony Page, former commercial director at Woolworths, together with former UBS banker Gareth Thomas, put together plans to establish a new general retailer to fill the gap on the High Street left by the demise of Woolworths. A team was recruited, including Andy Latham, former Woolworths' Head of Store Concessions and Development. Latham later announced that he was starting Alworths (the store being named after Latham's initials) using funding from a wealthy relative. Page and Thomas announced that they were consulting their lawyers on courses of action against Latham. The first Alworths store opened in Didcot on 5 November 2009, 100 years to the day after the original opening of the first British Woolworths store. Over the following 12 months, the number of Alworths stores increased to 18. Though the company has its head office based in the Surrey town of Redhill it did not open a branch there, with the former Woolworth's store in that town, situated adjacent to the belfry shopping centre, becoming a Wilkinsons instead (now Wilko).

On 1 March 2011, Andy Latham resigned as a director of the board. Latham set up a new company called Retail Acquisitions Ltd, with the same registered office as Alworths, prompting speculation that a pre-pack administration was being contemplated.

On Monday 28 March 2011 Alworths was placed into administration, with many stores no longer selling music, games or even pick n mix. A policy of no returns came into effect. By 25 April at least five stores had closed, including all the company's shops in Scotland.

On 5 May 2011, it was announced that the entire Alworths business had been bought by Poundstretcher who were acquiring 15 Alworths branches. Those not acquired were Llandudno and Evesham, (the latter was acquired by Poundland while the former store became Sainsbury's Local). Another in Amersham had already closed in 2010.

=== Legal action ===
In October 2009 it was announced that Latham had secured funding from a family member for a new company which would not involve Page or Thomas. Page said that as a result, he and Thomas were talking to their lawyers. In the end, Page and Thomas did not pursue legal action as the business did not succeed.

In addition to legal action threatened by Page and Thomas, on 30 October 2009, it was announced that Woolworths brand owner Shop Direct had written to Alworths to demand that it cease from "using a name and a product mix and trading off the back of the goodwill of the Woolworths business".

Shop Direct subsequently decided against legal action.

=== Stores ===
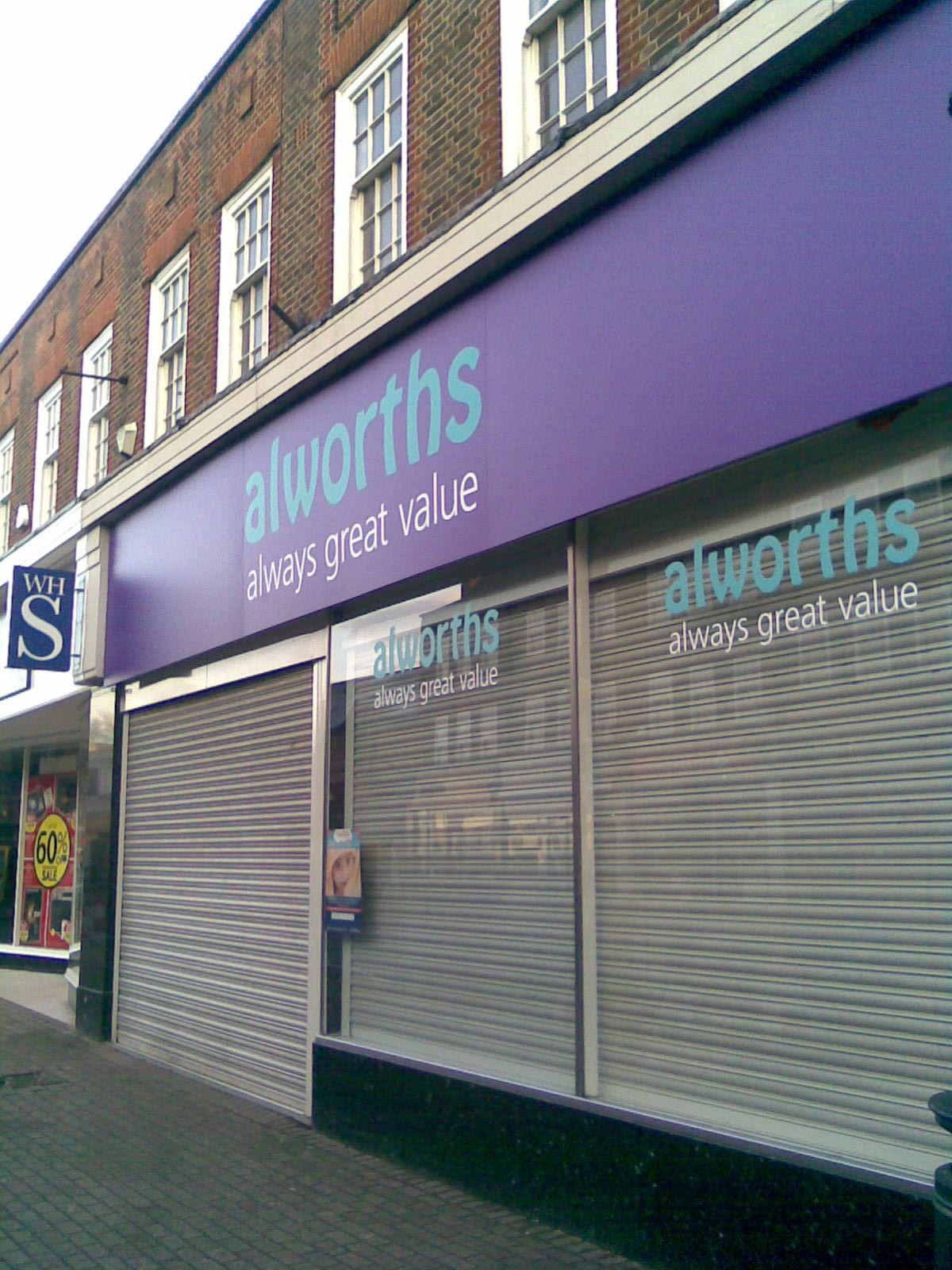
An Alworths storefront in place of a previous Woolworths installation, April 2010

Alworths' store openings were:

- Didcot in Oxfordshire on 5 November 2009 (relocated August 2010)
- Warminster in Wiltshire on 20 November 2009
- Amersham in Buckinghamshire on 12 November 2009 (not taken over)
- Evesham in Worcestershire on 19 November 2009 (not taken over, but instead taken over by Poundland.)
- Wokingham in Berkshire on 26 November 2009
- Cosham in Hampshire on 12 February 2010
- New Milton in Hampshire on 21 May 2010
- Cupar in Fife on 16 June 2010
- Forfar in Angus on 18 June 2010
- Alloa in Clackmannanshire on 21 July 2010
- Llandudno in Conwy on 13 August 2010 (not taken over)
- Tiverton in Devon on 25 August 2010
- Swadlincote in Derbyshire on 8 September 2010
- Newhaven in East Sussex on 10 September 2010
- Hertford in Hertfordshire on 22 September 2010
- Newark in Nottinghamshire on 23 November 2010
- Maidenhead in Berkshire on 26 November 2010
- Bellshill in Lanarkshire on 27 November 2010

Other locations mentioned as possible were Lanark in Lanarkshire, and Faversham, Kent.

The Didcot store opened on the 100th anniversary of the opening of the first Woolworths store in Britain, in the former Woolworths premises in Didcot, which had closed exactly eleven months earlier; many of the staff were former employees of Woolworths. At the Didcot opening, it was announced that a further 21 Alworths stores would open over the next year, including two others in Oxfordshire and 7 in Scotland. The Alloa branch, the tenth store to be opened (the third in Scotland), was the first not to be located in an old Woolworths store.

The original Didcot branch closed on 8 August 2010 and the re-located branch, in the same shopping centre, opened on 14 August 2010. Amersham in Buckinghamshire closed on 12 September 2010.

In early August 2010, Alworths store in Didcot closed and moved to a smaller store after the landlord refused to renew the one-year lease. The landlord initially hoped that Marks & Spencer (M&S) would take over the store; however, in the end Curry's took over the lease as the store did not meet M&S's specifications.

In the middle of August 2010, the landlord of another Alworths store in Amersham also refused to renew their one-year lease; however this time Alworths were unable to find another suitable premises in which to relocate which meant they had to leave the town. As of September 2014, this store is now a Waitrose.

After the company entered administration, the Evesham store closed, and did not reopen after the purchase of the company by Poundstrecher. That point marked the closure of the first three stores that Alworths had opened.

On 7 March 2011 the Llandudno branch was closed by the landlords for non-payment of rent; this store had been open for less than a year, and was already having a "closing down" sale.

== See also ==
- Wellchester, Dorchester store originally re-opened as Wellworths
- Woolworths.co.uk
- Woolworths
