= Instore =

Defunct British variety retailer

Instore plc
- Industry: Variety store
- Founded: 2003; 23 years ago
- Defunct: 2009; 17 years ago
- Fate: Absorbed into Poundstretcher

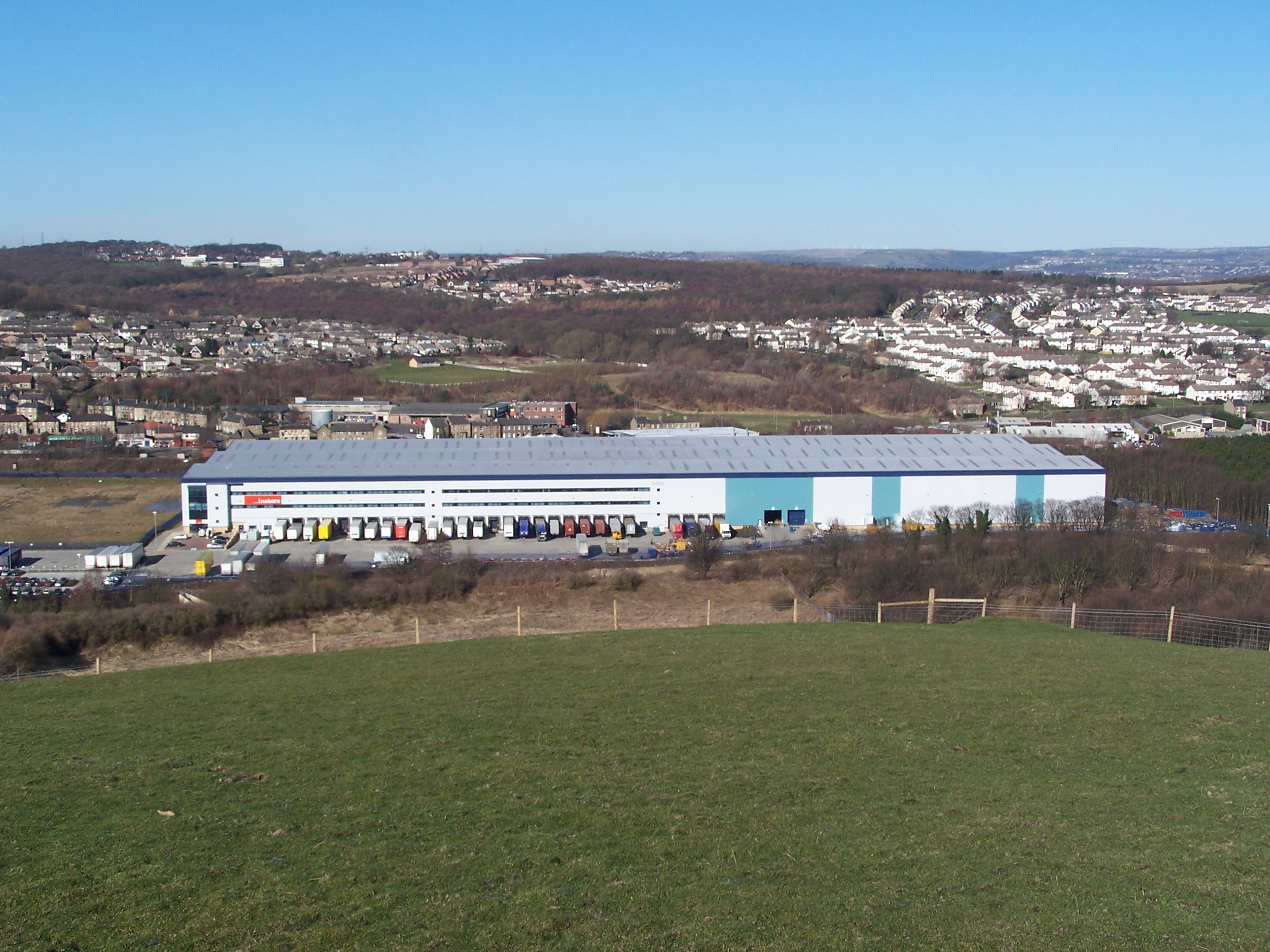
Headquarters and distribution centre in Huddersfield

Instore plc (stylised as ...instore) was a British variety retailer, founded in September 2003 by Poundstretcher owners, Brown and Jackson plc.

A large number of Poundstretcher locations were converted to the Instore format. The Instore chain had 89 stores by February 2005, increasing to 141 stores by February 2006, at which a profit warning was issued and the rollout was halted.

In February 2009, it was announced all Instore locations would be converted into Poundstretcher locations.

== History ==
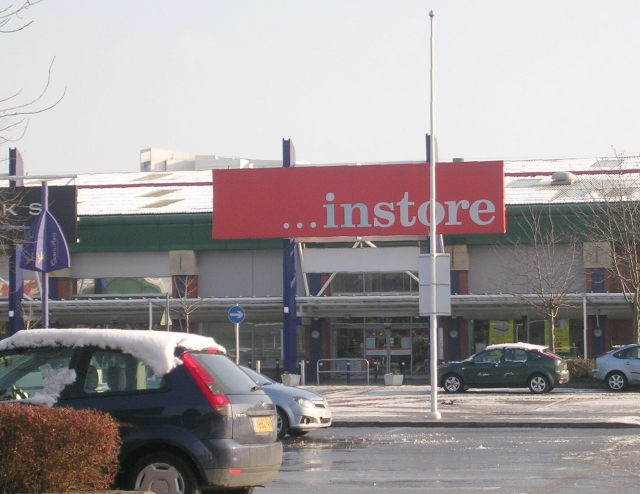
Instore, Leeds.

Brown & Jackson plc was the parent company of the retailer, operating 340 stores across the United Kingdom, including Poundstretcher.

The Instore name was created as part of a major rebranding of the existing, value led Poundstretcher business that had been trading since 1981. In September 2002, the company concluded a programme of rebranding half its Poundstretcher stores as Instore in an attempt to reposition the business as a more mid-market retailer.

In the early 2000s, Brown & Jackson's trading subsidiaries What Everyone Wants, Your More Stores and the Famous Brunswick Shoe Warehouse were also disposed of at this time. In 2004, Brown & Jackson sold its Polish retail business, which operated since 1999, to South African Pepkor. In July 2005 the company adopted the name of Instore plc, replacing the previous Brown & Jackson plc name.

During December 2006, the company issued a warning that its profits for the year would be likely to be well below expectations. This was blamed on difficulties experienced at the Huddersfield distribution centre following the introduction of a new software system and poor trading conditions. The company later reported that it was making progress in overcoming the problems it had experienced, and that sales growth for the six week period ending 13 January 2007 was 4.6%.

In 2006, a new chief executive concluded that the rebranding was not working and from 2007, new stores were opened as Poundstretcher stores. In January 2008, the company acquired 33 Ponden Mill stores under license from the administrators of the company, along with some rights to the Coloroll brand.

In May 2007, Peter Burdon, former chief executive of Thorntons, was installed as chief executive. In July 2008, the company rejected a £11.4 million cash offer for the business, arguing that the chain is being undervalued. The bid was made by Seaham Investments, who already control 30.6% of the company. In January 2009, a trading notice issued following the Christmas trading period was of a disappointment to the company, in which they said sales were not as expected.

=== Closure ===
In February 2009, John Jackson, chairman of Poundstretcher and Instore, announced that the Instore locations would gradually be reformatted as Poundstretcher Extra locations.
