= Faith (shoe retailer) =

British shoe retailer

- Industry: shoe retailer
- Founded: 1964
- Founder: Samuel Faith
- Defunct: 2010
- Fate: administration

Faith was a British shoe retailer founded in 1964 by London accountant Samuel Faith and his wife. In the following years new stores were gradually added, primarily in the South of England. After Samuel's retirement, his son Jonathan acquired the family business which he subsequently sold to Bridgepoint Capital in December 2004 for £65 million.

The company entered administration in 2010, and Debenhams purchased the brand and 115 Faith concessions operating within its stores.

== History ==
In the 1980s the brand launched its prosperous 'faith solo' brand, taking styles and ideas straight from the catwalk and selling them to a mainstream audience. The company also began a programme of opening concessions within selected Dorothy Perkins and Topshop stores.

In 1996 a contract was agreed with Topshop for Faith to open a concession in every Topshop store in the UK and Ireland. In the late 1990s Debenhams also approached Faith with a long-term view to becoming the main concession partner for young fashion ladies footwear. This form of expansion therefore became the only means of growth for the business for several years until 2001.

By 2001, concessions accounted for 75% of sales mainly through the Arcadia stores of Topshop, Dorothy Perkins and Miss Selfridge. In the autumn of 2001, Arcadia served notice that they intended to terminate the contract. Faced with this loss of revenue, the company embarked on a substantial programme of opening own-brand stores.

Topshop asked Faith to leave its stores in the summer of 2003 as they found there would be a higher profit in producing its own brand of footwear. This led to a huge expansion of both Faith branches and profits. Latterly there was only one Faith concession within Topshop (at Oxford Circus).

In 2004 there were approximately 1700 employees in the UK and Ireland, with further concessions operating under licence in the Middle East. There was also a division servicing the main UK mail order catalogues, such as Freemans and Littlewoods.

The brand celebrated its 40th anniversary in 2004. In December 2004, Faith Shoes was bought for £65 million by private equity group Bridgepoint Capital, and some years later entered into a pre-pack administration agreement in 2008, when John Kinnaird bought the business.

In April 2010, all stores were closed as part of a new administration procedure. Prior to administration it had 72 stand alone branches, as well as concessions in Allders, Debenhams, Sunwin House, and Beatties. Debenhams purchased the 115 Faith concessions trading within its stores in July 2010.

== "Hope" store ==
In April 2010, after Faith Footwear Ltd went into administration, 70 stores were closed, and more than 1700 staff lost their jobs. Inspired by the former Dorchester Woolworth's Store Manager Claire Robertson's success in reopening her store as 'Wellworths', the Chelmsford branch of Faith got together and reopened their store on 3 July 2010 as 'Hope'.

In the official press release Store Manager Justina Pay stated: "We were inspired by Claire Robertson and her success in turning her old Dorchester Woolworths store into Wellworths, a great example of someone who has had a massive success from a very sad redundancy. Customers were genuine in their sadness that our stores were closing and were concerned as to where they could buy quality shoes from, we knew we had to 'do a Wellworths' and try and bring it back!".
