= Pound Shop Wars =

2012–2015 British TV documentary series

- Genre: Factual
- Directed by: Kerry Brierley; Emeka Onono; Andrew Dedman; Tom Williams; Victoria Bell
- Narrated by: Caroline Aherne
- Country of origin: United Kingdom
- Original language: English
- No. of series: 2
- No. of episodes: 13 (list of episodes)

Production
- Executive producers: Samantha Anstiss; Cat Lewis; Dominique Walker
- Producer: Kerry Brierley
- Running time: 30 minutes
- Production company: Nine Lives Media

Original release
- Network: BBC One
- Release: 7 November 2012 – 30 September 2015

Pound Shop Wars is a British factual television series that was first broadcast on BBC One from 7 November 2012 until 30 September 2015. Narrated by Caroline Aherne, the series shows the competition between rival pound shops, focusing on Poundworld. The second series, comprising eight episodes, began on 12 August 2015.

== Episode list ==
=== Pilot (2012) ===
No. in series	Title	Directed by	Original release date	UK viewers (millions)
1	"Pilot"	Kerry Brierley	7 November 2012	4.80
A price war between 99p Stores and Poundworld threatens to erupt, forcing Poundworld CEO Chris to take evasive action.

=== Series 1 (2014) ===
No. in series	Title	Directed by	Original release date	UK viewers (millions)
1	"The Battle of the Bra"	Emeka Onono	6 February 2014	5.66
When Poundland reduces its prices, Poundworld retaliates by launching the £1 bra. Poundworld area manager Craig and finance director Ian come head to head over staffing levels.
2	"David and Goliath"	Emeka Onono	13 February 2014	4.72
A Poundworld store opens near Peterborough's longest-running small independent pound shops.
3	"£1 Crime Spree"	Emeka Onono	19 February 2014	3.75
Poundworld CEO Chris Edwards decides to employ undercover store detectives.
4	"Too Posh to Pound Shop?"	Emeka Onono	27 February 2014	5.29
Chris fights to win middle class customers by opening a branch in Harrogate.

=== Series 2 (2015) ===
No. in series	Title	Directed by	Original release date	UK viewers (millions)
1	"Trouble in Scarborough"	Andrew Dedman	12 August 2015	Below 3.47
A gaping hole is left in Chris's management team as some of his top staff defect
2	"Battle of the Loom Bands"	Andrew Dedman	19 August 2015	TBC
Boss Chris is tipped off by his granddaughter that the latest trend is loom bands.
3	"Forty New Shops"	Emeka Onono	26 August 2015	TBC
The CEO of Poundworld, Chris Edwards, is back with ambitious plans for expansion.
4	"The Multi-Price Battle"	Tom Williams	2 September 2015	TBC
With multi-price retailers doing well, Chris decides he wants a piece of the pie.
5	"Halloween High Jinks"	Victoria Bell	9 September 2015	TBC
Rival stores compete for the crown of Best Halloween Pound Shop in South Wales.
6	"South Coast Invasion"	Tom Williams	16 September 2015	TBC
Boss Chris tries to plant the Poundworld flag down South.
7	"A Frozen Frenzy"	Victoria Bell	23 September 2015	TBC
Chris does a deal with Disney to produce a massive range of Frozen merchandise.
8	"Battles in Cyberspace"	Tom Williams	30 September 2015	TBC
Two pound shop giants launch competing websites to crack the online market.

== Reception ==
=== Ratings ===
The first one-off hour-long special episode had a 19.8% audience share. According to overnight figures, "The Battle of the Bra" had a viewing audience of 5.42 million, with 23.7% watching it. The third and fourth episodes had viewing audiences of 19.4% and 16.7% respectively.

=== Critical reception ===
Tim Dowling of The Guardian said the series "was not enhanced by Caroline Aherne's jokey narration, and it had more than its fair share of isn't-he-a-character type characters, but it was saved for me by a surprising discovery: the pound shop business is actually pretty interesting." Metro's Caroline Westbrook said it "certainly didn't disappoint". Bath Chronicle called the narration "lacklustre" and commented on how boring the series was. Andrew Billen from The Times gave the programme three stars out of five. The Sunday Times said "Full marks to the makers of this documentary, who find a clever and absorbing way to tell the story of the biggest current trend on Britain's high streets."

== See also ==
- Poundland
- 99p Stores
