= Yorkshire Trading Company =

English chain of variety and discount stores

YTC Limited
- The company's logo
- Trade name: Yorkshire Trading Company
- Type: Limited
- Industry: Retail
- Founded: 1954; 72 years ago Kingston upon Hull, United Kingdom
- Founder: John and Molly Nichols
- Headquarters: Driffield, United Kingdom
- Number of locations: 40 (including 1 Goodwins branded store)
- Key people: James, Edward & Michael Nichols
- Products: clothing, crafts, homeware, haberdashery, DIY, toys, confectionery, pet care
- Number of employees: 425
- Website: yorkshiretrading.com

YTC Limited, trading as Yorkshire Trading Company, is a chain of variety and discount stores founded and based in Northern England, it is a family-run business dating back to 1954 and is now into the third and fourth generations. It operates 39 Yorkshire Trading Company stores from as far north as Berwick-upon-Tweed in Northumberland to Melton Mowbray in Leicestershire.

== History ==
In 1954, John Nichols opened his first shop in Kingston upon Hull, by 1985 the Nichols family (John, his wife Molly and his two sons Paul and Robert) had eight stores in towns such as Whitby and Bridlington, and in 1995 the store count had increased to 12 with locations in Richmond, North Yorkshire and Ripon. With the demise of high street giant Woolworths in 2008, 11 more shops were also added to the portfolio.

The business had several speciality stores under different names; James Piper was the name given to a glassware store in Driffield operated by Tom Nichols, John's youngest son. Other store names such as JC Nichols and Barmy Bob's were phased out in 2000 as the company rebranded all of their locations under the Yorkshire Trading Company banner and became a limited company.

In 2015, work was completed on the construction of a new purpose-built distribution centre and head office, costing £7 million, located at Kellythorpe Industrial Estate, Driffield.

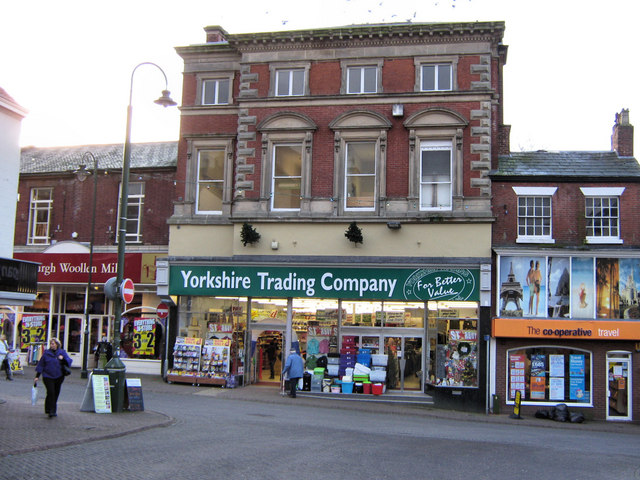
Yorkshire Trading store in Leek

== Rydale ==
A range of outdoor, equestrian and country fashion that is designed in-house and manufactured mostly in the United Kingdom. The first Rydale products were imported in 2001 (then known as Snow Drop), and since then it has become the largest clothing operation on trade show circuits around the UK, with over 140 shows attended.

== Goodwins ==
Goodwins began life as a single price point store, selling all items for £1 or less, but now operates as a multi-price point discount retailer. As of 2018, four Goodwins branded stores were operational, the original being found in Bridlington and the others in Northallerton, Redcar and Richmond, North Yorkshire. As of 2023, only the Goodwins store in Bridlington remains. Goodwins previously opened a temporary store on the site of the former JJB Sports in Scarborough, North Yorkshire. There is no mention of the Goodwins brand on the Yorkshire Trading website.

Rydale Logo

Previous Goodwins Logo
