= Gerald Weisfeld =

British businessman (1940–2020)

- Born: 17 March 1940; London, England
- Died: 13 January 2020 (aged 79)
- Occupation: Businessman
- Known for: Founder, What Every Woman Wants
- Spouse: Vera Weisfeld
- Children: 3

Gerald Weisfeld (17 March 1940 – 13 January 2020) was a British businessman, and the founder of the What Every Woman Wants (WEWW) retail chain, which at one time had 130 stores in the UK.

Weisfeld was born in London to a Jewish family, and left school aged 15 without any qualifications.

Together with his wife Vera, Weisfeld started with one small shop in Glasgow, and grew What Every Woman Wants into 130 stores, before selling the chain in 1990 for £50 million.

In 1990, WEWW was sold to Brown & Jackson, and was later bought by Amber Day, run by Philip Green, and Weisfeld was later acrimoniously dismissed as chairman.

Weisfeld had three children with his first wife.

In December 2018, Weisfeld, aged 78 and suffering from dementia, became the first resident of Bothwell Castle Care Home, Glasgow.

Weisfeld died on 13 January 2020, aged 79. Vera Weisfeld died from cancer on 4 December 2025, at the age of 87.
