= OneBeyond =

British variety store

OneBeyond Retail Limited
- Formerly: OneBelow Retail Limited (2018–2023)
- Type: Private
- Industry: Variety store
- Predecessor: Poundworld
- Founded: 29 September 2018; 8 years ago in Cleckheaton, West Yorkshire, England
- Founder: Christopher Edwards Sr.
- Headquarters: Dodworth, Barnsley, England
- Number of locations: 116 (September 2026)
- Key people: Christopher Edwards Jr. (Director)
- Revenue: ▲£79.324 million (2022)
- Owner: Christopher Edwards Sr.
- Number of employees: 1,038 (2022)
- Website: onebeyond.co.uk

OneBeyond Retail Limited (formerly known as OneBelow Retail Limited) is a British variety store launched by Christopher Edwards and Chris Edwards Sr. Christopher Edwards is managing director while father Chris Edwards Sr is chairman.

== History ==
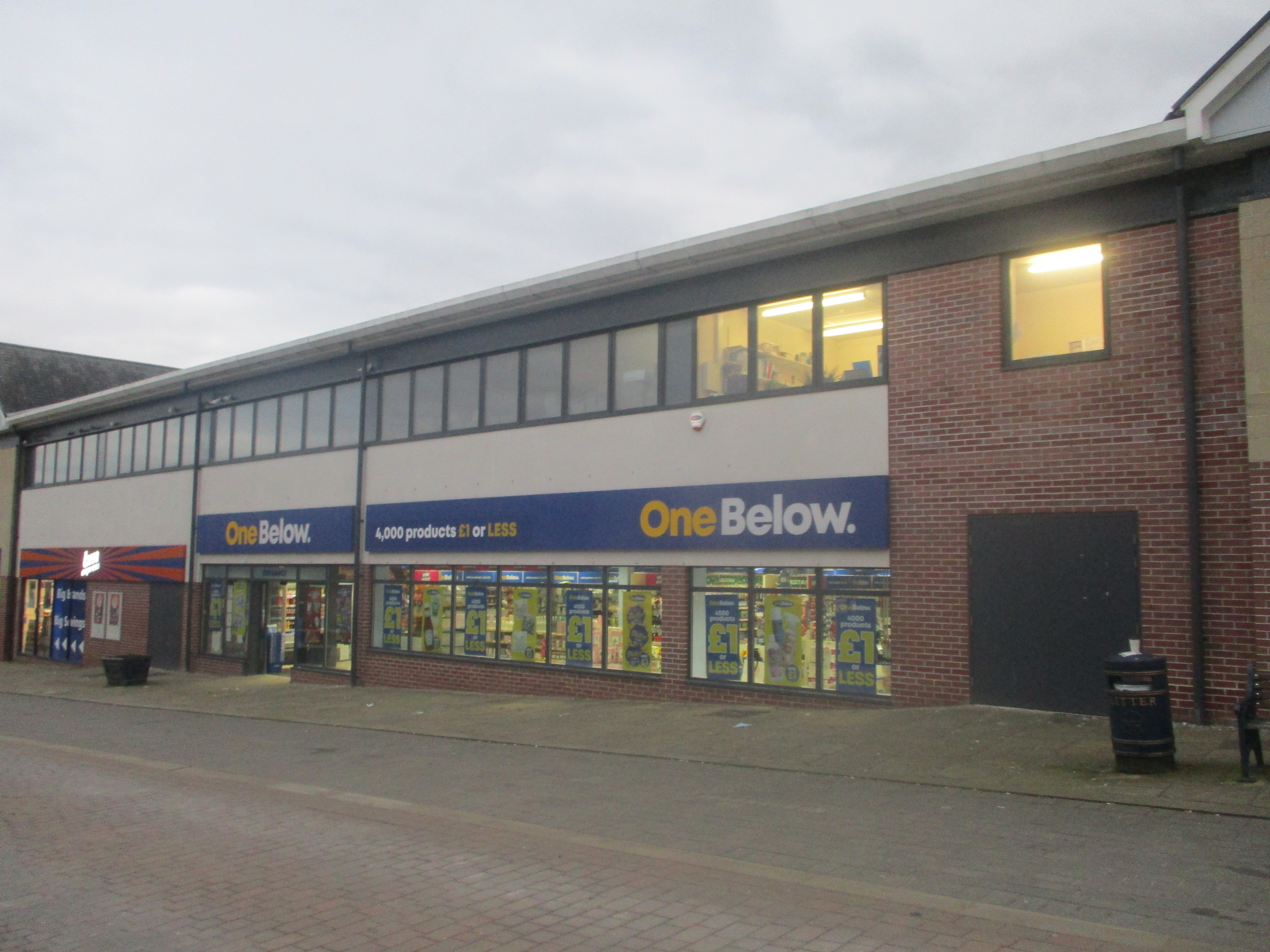
One Below in Rothwell, West Yorkshire.

In October 2018, it was announced that Poundworld founders Christopher Edwards and Chris Edwards Sr would be launching their own new variety store, where products are sold for £1 or less. OneBelow was incorporated on 29 September 2018 as OneBelow Retail Limited. One Below would be very similar to Edwards former venture of Poundworld which went into administration in June 2018.

On 1 March 2019 OneBelow opened four new stores on the same day, with branches in Doncaster, South Shields and two more in two different areas of Leeds in Kirkstall and Rothwell. All of the new OneBelow shops that opened on 1 March 2019 were placed in former Poundworld spaces and retail units. When asked about OneBelow, Edwards said in an interview "We've had a good response from landlords we've dealt with historically. We're lining shops up and most of them are going to be Poundworld sites." OneBelow are aiming to have 100 stores open and trading by the end of 2019.

On 4 March 2019 OneBelow announced that on 8 March 2019 at 12:00pm four more stores will open in Nottingham Victoria Centre, Manchester Fort Retail Park, Redcar High Street and Wolverhampton Mander Centre. OneBelow also announced that four more stores: Westgate Retail Park Wakefield, Fishponds Retail Park Bristol, St Helens Hardshaw Centre and Leeds Crown Point would open on 16 March 2019, bringing the total number of stores to 12 in less than a month.

Following surging inflation and considerably higher import costs, the chain rebranded to OneBeyond from September 2022, with a new strapline of Amazing value from only £1. Director Chris Edwards said that the rebrand was always intending to happen, however was brought forward by around a year due to inflation challenges of 2022. The strapline is the third adopted by the chain since its inception in 2018, with the previous one being 4,000 products £1 or less. The company's name was legally changed to OneBeyond Retail Limited on 10 February 2023.

== Financial performance ==
Year ending	Turnover (£m)	Profit				Number of Employees
Year ending	Turnover (£m)	Gross (£m)	Operating (£m)	Post-tax (£m)	Number of Stores	Number of Employees
31 January 2022	79.32	14.05	2.37	1.84	79	1,038
31 January 2021	64.59	10.53	2.58	1.87	70	881
31 January 2020 (16 Months)	45.87	7.69	-1.11	0.79	60	656
