= Wellchester =

Former retail store in Dorchester, Dorset, England

- The Wellchester logo 2010–2012

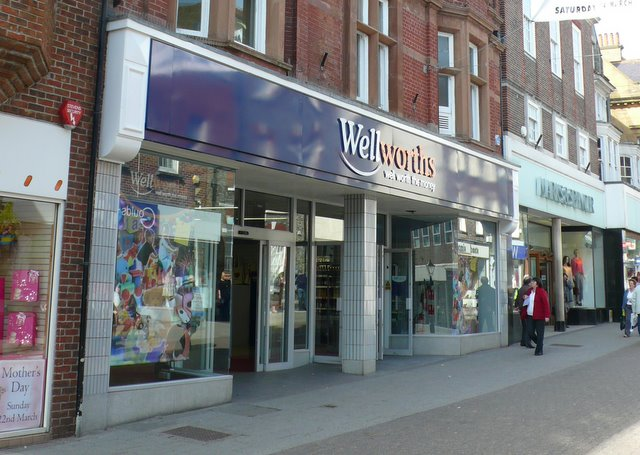
- Wellworths in Dorchester January 2009
- Formerly: Wellworths (2009–2010)
- Company type: subsidiary
- Industry: Retail
- Genre: Stationery, Confectionery, Frames, DIY, Toys, Seasonal, Household
- Predecessor: Woolworths
- Founded: 11 March 2009
- Founder: Claire Robertson
- Defunct: 18 August 2012
- Fate: Closed
- Successor: Woolworths.co.uk
- Headquarters: Dorchester, Dorset, England
- Area served: Dorchester
- Key people: Claire Robertson (CEO: 2009–2012)
- Products: General merchandise
- Owner: Wellchester Stores Ltd.
- Number of employees: 23
- Website: www.wellchester.co.uk

Wellchester (originally Wellworths) was a retail store in Dorchester, Dorset, England.

== History ==
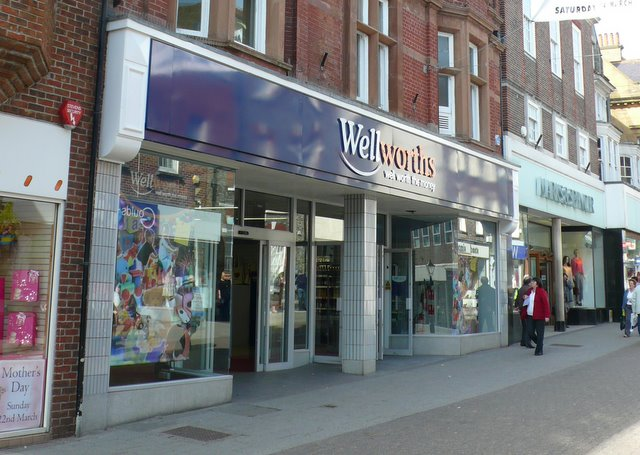
Wellworths in Dorchester

January 2009 saw the closure of the final 200 Woolworths stores in the UK, including the Dorchester branch. At the time of closure, Claire Robertson was the store manager and after the closure of her branch, she decided to open her own version of the store in the former Woolworths premises BBC Radio 2 DJ Chris Evans officially re-opened the store on 11 March 2009 at 10 am.

On 2 April 2009, BBC One aired a documentary entitled How Woolies Became Wellies: One Woman's Fight for the High Street, following Robertson's journey from the closing of Woolworths to the opening of Wellworths.

Weeks after the store opened, the store was the subject of significant media coverage from across Europe. Just three months after the opening of the store, Wellworths celebrated its 100,000th customer. Robertson said that she never expected to get through 100,000 so soon after the store's opening day.

Wellworths logo 2009–2010

In October 2010 it was revealed that the store would change its name to Wellchester after pressure from Shop Direct Group, owner of the Woolworths brand.

In July 2012, it was announced that the store would be closing in the following month. A closing-down sale went ahead in August, and Poundland applied for planning permission to take over the premises. The Wellchester store finally closed its doors on 18 August.

== Legacy ==
In April 2010 Faith Footwear Ltd went into administration and 70 stores were closed, more than 1700 staff lost their jobs. Inspired by Claire Robertson's success the Chelmsford branch of Faith was reopened by the staff who used to work in the store on 3 July 2010, the new business is called 'Hope'. In the official press release Store Manager Justina Pay stated: "We were inspired by Claire Robertson and her success in turning her old Dorchester Woolworths store into Wellworths, a great example of someone who has had a massive success from a very sad redundancy. Customers were genuine in their sadness that our stores were closing and were concerned as to where they could buy quality shoes from, we knew we had to 'do a Wellworths' and try and bring it back!"
