= Bargain Buys =

British variety retailer

- Logo introduced by Poundstretcher in 2018
- Type: Private (trading style)
- Industry: Retail
- Founded: November 2013; 13 years ago
- Headquarters: Kirby Muxloe, Leicester
- Number of locations: 30+ (2026)
- Area served: United Kingdom
- Products: Groceries; Consumer goods; Garden and leisure; Pet supplies; Stationery; Toiletries; DIY
- Parent: Poundstretcher

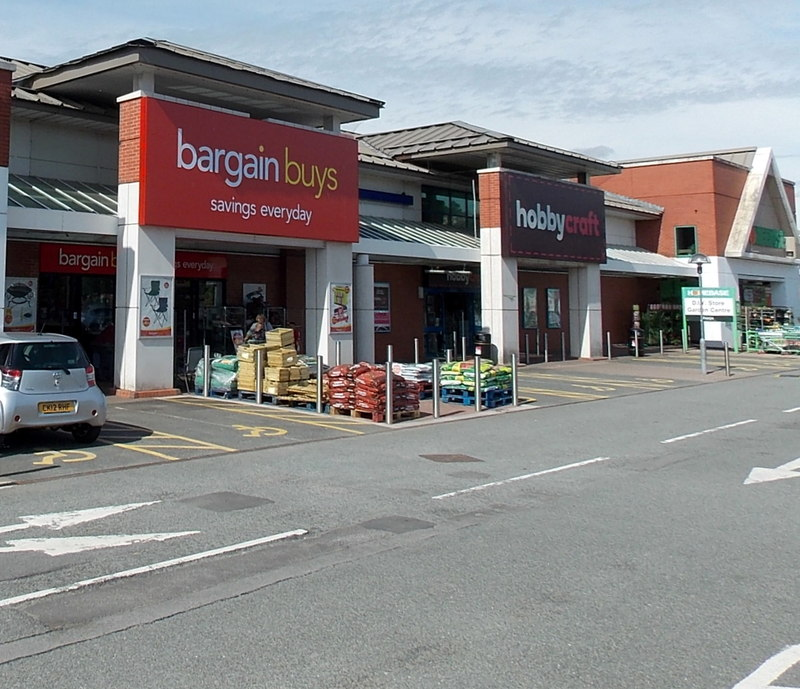
A location in Newport, South Wales, pictured in 2014.

Bargain Buys is a British variety retailer, and a trading style of Poundstretcher. The company is based alongside Poundstretcher in Kirby Muxloe, Leicester.

The Bargain Buys name was first used by single-price retailer Poundworld in November 2013 to replace their multi-price chain, DiscountUK. In May 2015, TPG Capital purchased a majority stake in Poundworld and Bargain Buys, however both chains went into administration in June 2018 and closed all locations.

During the administration process, Poundstretcher had attempted to acquire 200 Poundworld and Bargain Buys leases from the administrators, but failed to reach terms. As a result, Poundstretcher began individually acquiring leases through the landlords directly. Poundstretcher reopened the closed Bargain Buys locations in Paisley, Newport and West Bromwich, however not rebranding these stores as Poundstretcher and retaining the 'Bargain Buys' name in commercial use.

As of September 2026, there are 30+ Bargain Buys stores.

== History ==
=== Poundworld subsidiary (2013–2018) ===
The logo from 2013 to 2018.

Bargain Buys' first store was opened in Walsall in November 2013 by Poundworld, who were maintaining a multi-price brand to complement their core single-price model. Bargain Buys was the result of rebranding existing Discount UK (Discount NI in Northern Ireland) stores, initially launched in October 2010. However, a location in Warrington would continue to use the DiscountUK brand as a clearance outlet.

The name was changed from DiscountUK to Bargain Buys to allow the chain to compete more closely with its rivals in the market (such as B&M and Home Bargains), and to exploit the expanded product range and knowledge that the business had built up.

By February 2015, Bargain Buys had 31 stores across the United Kingdom. Bargain Buys intended to expand rapidly, with plans to double the number of stores by 2016, and to open an additional 100 stores by 2018.

In April 2015, Bargain Buys launched an online store in a bid to expand its customer base.

On 15 May 2015, the Edwards family announced that they had sold a majority stake in both Poundworld and Bargain Buys business to US private equity firm TPG for £150 million.

On 11 June 2018, TPG announced that the Poundworld and Bargain Buys stores had appointed administrators after talks to sell the company fell through.

Around June 2018, the official website was shut, and its social media pages stopped being updated with new products and offers. Any remaining Poundworld stores closed in early August. It's not clear whether any Bargain Buys stores remained trading this long as well, or were closed earlier in July. There were 20 Bargain Buys stores by the time of administration.

=== Poundstretcher subsidiary (2018–present) ===
Poundstretcher attempted to acquire 200 Poundworld and Bargain Buys leases from the administrators, but failed to meet agreement terms in time. Therefore, from September 2018, Poundstretcher began acquiring individual leases through the landlords. Poundstretcher reopened the closed Bargain Buys locations in Paisley, Newport and West Bromwich, however did not rebrand these stores as Poundstretcher, and retained the 'Bargain Buys' name. In the instance of the Newport location (at Harlech Retail Park), Poundstretcher retained the former 'Bargain Buys' fascia from the previous Poundworld incarnation.

Poundworld had not trademarked 'Bargain Buys' before its administration. Businessman Manni Hussain (who purchased the Poundworld intellectual property assets) applied to register 'Bargain Buys' as a word trademark in October 2018, however this application would be refused in February 2019 due to a lack of distinction. Poundstretcher registered a Bargain Buys logo trademark including their 'big brands, big discounts' slogan in November 2018, which was entered into the register in March 2019.

By October 2019, Poundstretcher had opened over 75 Bargain Buys stores, many of which opened in former Poundworld units.

As of September 2026, there are 30+ Bargain Buys stores.

== See also ==
- Poundstretcher
- Poundworld
