= Store Twenty One =

Clothing and homeware retailer

Store Twenty One (Store 21)

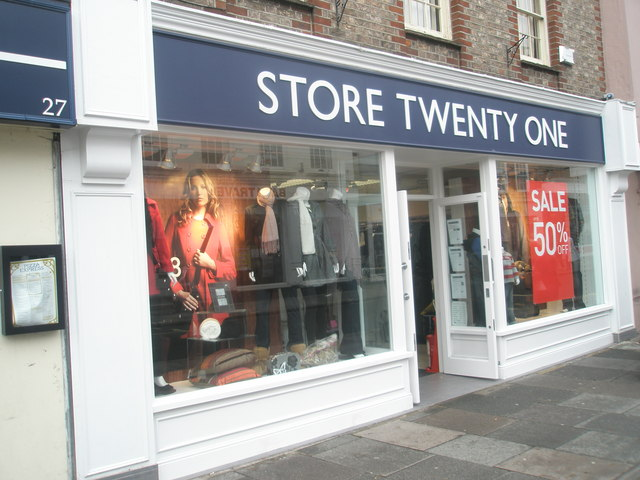
- A Store Twenty One in Chichester, England
- Company type: Private company
- Industry: Fashion
- Predecessor: Quality Seconds and Bewise
- Founded: 1932 in London, England
- Defunct: 2017
- Fate: Liquidation
- Headquarters: Solihull, West Midlands, United Kingdom
- Area served: United Kingdom
- Key people: Grabal Alok
- Products: Clothing

Store Twenty One was a British discount clothing and homeware retailer in the United Kingdom. It entered compulsory liquidation on 11 July 2017.

== History ==
Store Twenty One was created by Grabal Alok, the Indian-owned textile manufacturer which bought parts of the QS Stores (formerly Quality Seconds) and Bewise chains that went into administration in 2006. Quality Seconds was founded in 1932 as a clothing supplier, and opened stores in the 1960s to sell factory seconds to the public. From the 1980s, QS stopped selling seconds, but remained a discount clothing store.

In May 2015, the business had 125 stores nationwide, selling a selection of fashion and homeware at discounted prices. Its head office was based in Solihull, West Midlands, England.

In July 2016, it was reported that Store Twenty One was facing financial difficulties and that some stores were closing down, as it faced going into administration in August if no agreement in reducing rents was agreed. In July 2016, it was proposed and agreed that company voluntary arrangement action should be taken.

In May 2017, it was reported that Store Twenty One was on the brink of going into administration for the second time, due to poor trading conditions and corporate mismanagement. A total of seventy seven stores were scheduled to be closed over the following months. The entire remaining business entered compulsory liquidation on 11 July 2017, closing all remaining stores.
