= Poundworld =

British variety store

- Logo used from 2003 to 2018
- Formerly: Bargain Centre (1974–1997); Everything £1 (1997–2003); DiscountUK (2010–); Bargain Buys (2013–)
- Industry: Retail
- Founded: 1974; 52 years ago
- Founder: Christopher Edwards Sr.
- Defunct: 10 August 2018
- Fate: Administration
- Number of locations: 335 (2018)

Poundworld was a British variety retailer. It was founded in 1974 as Bargain Centre by Yorkshire-based father-and-son team Chris Edwards Sr. and Chris Edwards Jr. The business then became a single-price retailer in 1997 as Everything £1, before renaming to Poundworld in 2003.

The retailer rose to prominence during the 2008 financial crisis. In October 2010, it launched the multi-price sister brand DiscountUK, most DiscountUK locations became Bargain Buys in 2013. However, a location in Warrington would continue to use the DiscountUK brand as a clearance outlet. Poundworld was featured on the BBC One series Pound Shop Wars, broadcast between 2012 and 2015, featuring its rivalry with Poundland.

In May 2015, the Edwards family sold a majority stake in Poundworld to private-equity firm TPG Capital. The retailer went on to struggle in the following years; for due to the weak pound, it could no longer sell most of its items (which were imported) at the £1 price-point.

In June 2018, Poundworld entered administration. The remaining stores closed down on 10 August 2018. The Poundworld brand was purchased by businessman Manni Hussain, pledging to return the chain to the high street. These plans failed as Hussain later gave up property elsewhere on suspicion of money laundering.

== History ==
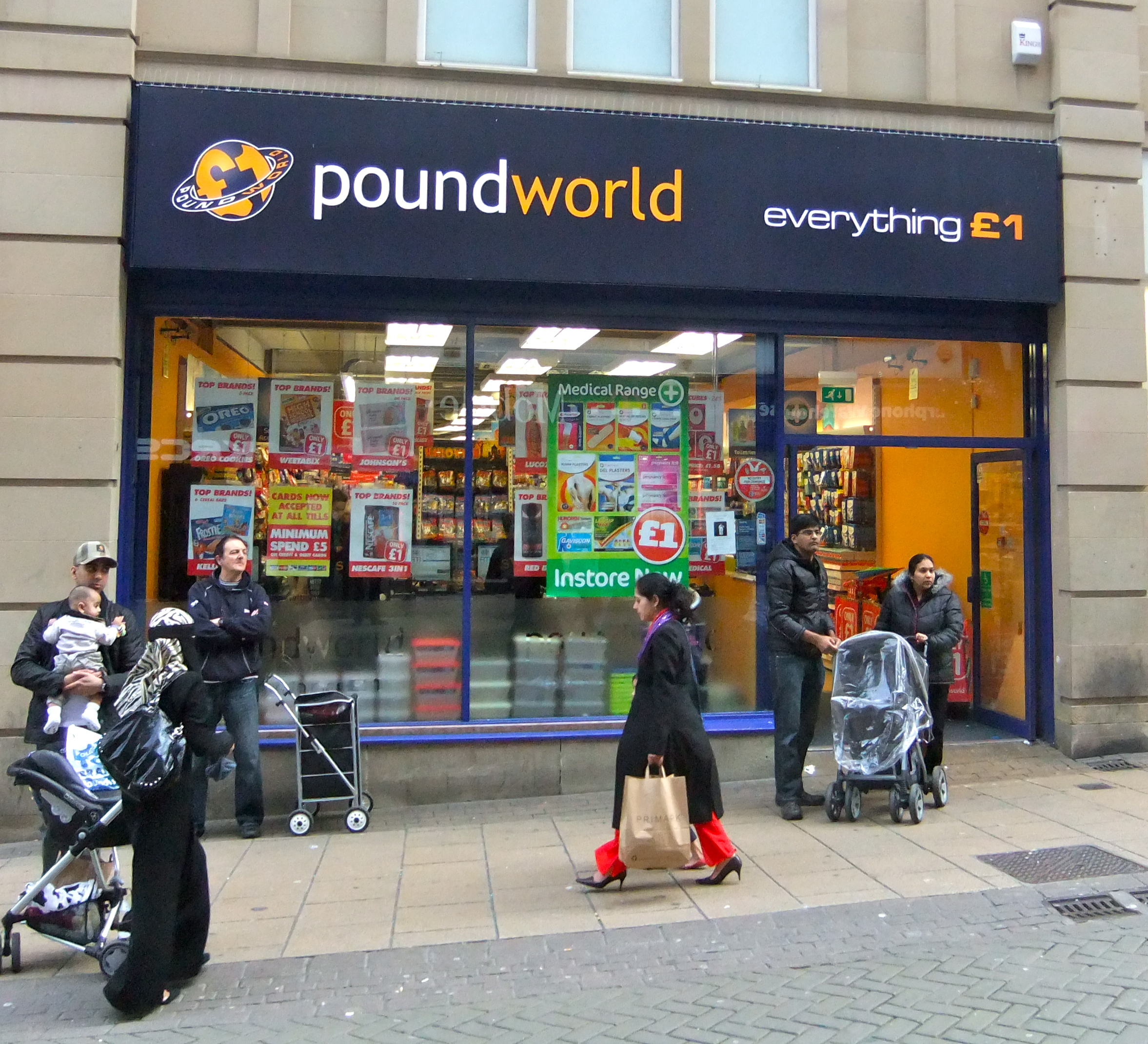
Poundworld store in Bradford

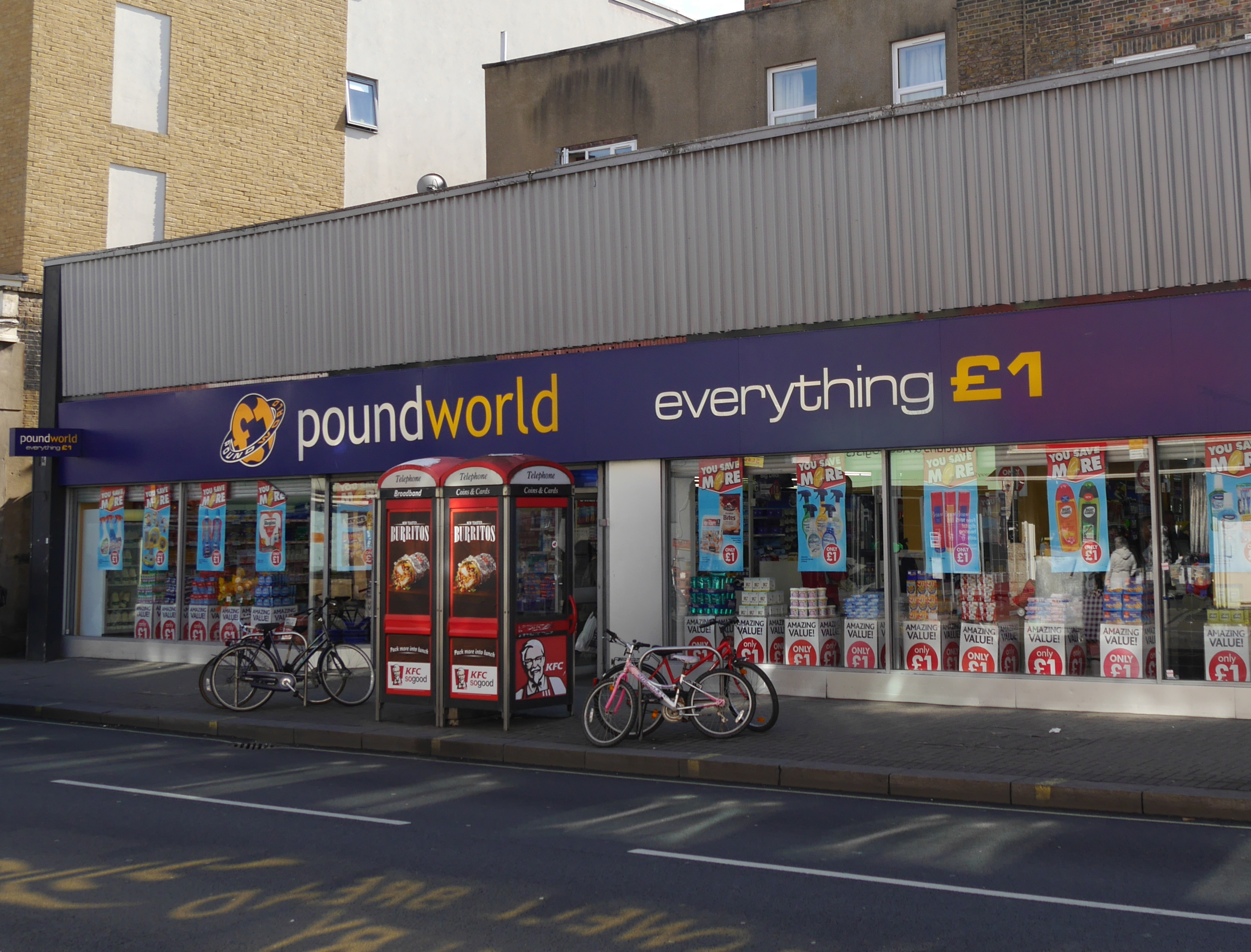
Poundworld, North End Road, Fulham, London

The chain originated in 1974, when Christopher Edwards Sr. set up a market stall in his home town of Wakefield. He initially set up a multi-price store called "Bargain Centre", before switching to a single-price format in 1997, trading as "Everything £1" at 58, Westgate, Bradford. Edwards renamed the chain "Poundworld" in 2003.

From the onset of the recession that started in 2007, Poundworld expanded rapidly. Its sales grew by 42% between 2010 and 2011, and increased by 55%, with revenues of £200m, in 2012. Its expansion meant that the company required larger premises, and it relocated its head offices to the largest unit in Yorkshire's main warehousing and distribution base. It also opened an overseas office in Shanghai during this period.

In October 2013, Poundworld partnered with the Marie Curie Cancer Care charity, which it had already supported during 2013's Great Daffodil Appeal. To date, the company has raised in excess of £900,000 to help care for those (and their families) living with a terminal illness.

In November 2013, Poundworld opened its first multi-price retail store, in Walsall, under the name Bargain Buys. Bargain Buys was originally named (and briefly traded as) Discount UK, with the name change allowing the chain to compete more closely with its rivals in the market. The company planned to open a further 100 stores in the next three years.

In July 2014, the store secured a £26m loan from Santander for two purposes: to finance its stated aim of increasing its approximately 240 stores by 40 or 50 a year for the next three years; and to strengthen its overseas supply chain, whence about 30% of its supplies was sourced.

The Edwards (father and son) were placed at Number 12 in Management Today's annual list of Britain's Top 100 Entrepreneurs in October 2014. In the same month, Poundworld Retail was named one of the United Kingdom's fastest-growing retailers in the Sunday Times Grant Thornton Top Track 250.

On 15 May 2015, the company announced that it had sold a majority stake in the business to private equity firm TPG Capital for £150 million, with Christopher Edwards, his son, and other senior executives retaining a substantial minority holding, allowing the family to retain the day-to-day running of the business. Poundworld announced that the investment from TPG would allow the business to grow, with further plans for store expansion. Shortly after the deal, the company announced that it had begun construction of a new distribution centre in Normanton as part of a plan to create 4,000 jobs, and hoped to open a further 200 new stores in the next three years.

In early 2018, TPG proposed to put the company through a Company Voluntary Arrangement (CVA) to restructure the business by closing around 100 of its existing 355 stores. However, during the process, TPG was approached by third parties interested in buying the company; it agreed, in May 2018, to put the CVA process on hold, and to look at a sale. In June 2018, Alteri Investors pulled out of talks to buy Poundworld.

=== Administration ===
After rescue talks with potential buyer R Capital failed, the company entered administration on 11 June 2018, the same day that electrical retailer Maplin became defunct. The administrators, Deloitte, continued to run the business as normal.

On 19 June 2018, one hundred staff from the company's head office were made redundant. A day later, the company began closing down sales at all of its over 300 stores, although they stated that no stores were "definitely" closing. A further 20 head office staff were made redundant on 29 June 2018.

After much speculation in the media, it emerged that the founder, Chris Edwards, was in talks to rescue the struggling business, but that there were bitter divisions between Edwards and the administrators, Deloitte. The discussions appeared to come to a sudden conclusion on 5 July 2018, when it was reported that Edwards' bid had been rejected, placing the future of the business in fresh doubt.

On 10 July 2018, Deloitte confirmed that 25 of the troubled retailer's stores would formally close. The last day of trading for these stores was to be 15 July 2018, resulting in the loss of a reported 242 jobs.

A few days after this announcement, it was confirmed that another 80 stores would close, resulting in the loss of around 1,024 jobs. The 80 affected stores were to close on 22 July 2018.

On 17 July 2018, it was revealed a further 40 stores would be closing costing another 531 jobs; the affected 40 stores were to close on 24 July 2018.

It was revealed on 19 July 2018 that the remaining 190 stores were to close on 10 August 2018, costing 2,339 jobs; after this date Poundworld would cease trading.

Businessman Manni Hussain purchased the Poundworld intellectual property from administrators and sought to return the retailer. However, the UK National Crime Agency issued an Unexplained Wealth Order, on the basis of suspected money laundering, forcing him to hand over various real estate properties.

== Online ==
In May 2012, the company launched a wholesale website, targeted at market traders, eBay sellers and independent retailers. The website offers over 2,000 products including cleaning, DIY, stationery and pet care. Since launching online, the operation has seen a sales increase of 400%.

The company followed this in February 2014 by launching a retail online pound store named poundshop.com. Poundworld supplied stock and product images for the single price website – the first of its kind. However, Poundworld decided to leave the project after six months, citing "a failure to reach a shared vision" with Smith. It launched another online shop in April 2015: Poundworld Plus, offering over 4,000 products, all at £1. It later changed the website name to Poundworld.co.uk.

== Notable products ==
In June 2013, Poundworld launched a comfort bra priced at £1 and sold over 100,000 in a single day. The bra, made in China, received some criticism for its unglamorous appearance and its recommendation to hand-wash only.

In November 2014, the company started selling a range of merchandise relating to Disney's film Frozen. At Poundworld's new store opening in Merthyr Tydfil in October, people waited for over an hour before it opened; fights broke out as stocks ran low.

== ASA ruling on slogan ==
Former Poundworld logo with the "Everything £1" slogan

In October 2014, The Advertising Standards Authority (ASA) ruled that Poundworld's "Everything £1" slogan was misleading, as some items were priced at up to £8.99. Poundworld stated that the products in question were 'Manager Specials', and were only offered at Christmas and occasionally throughout the year.

== Pound Shop Wars ==
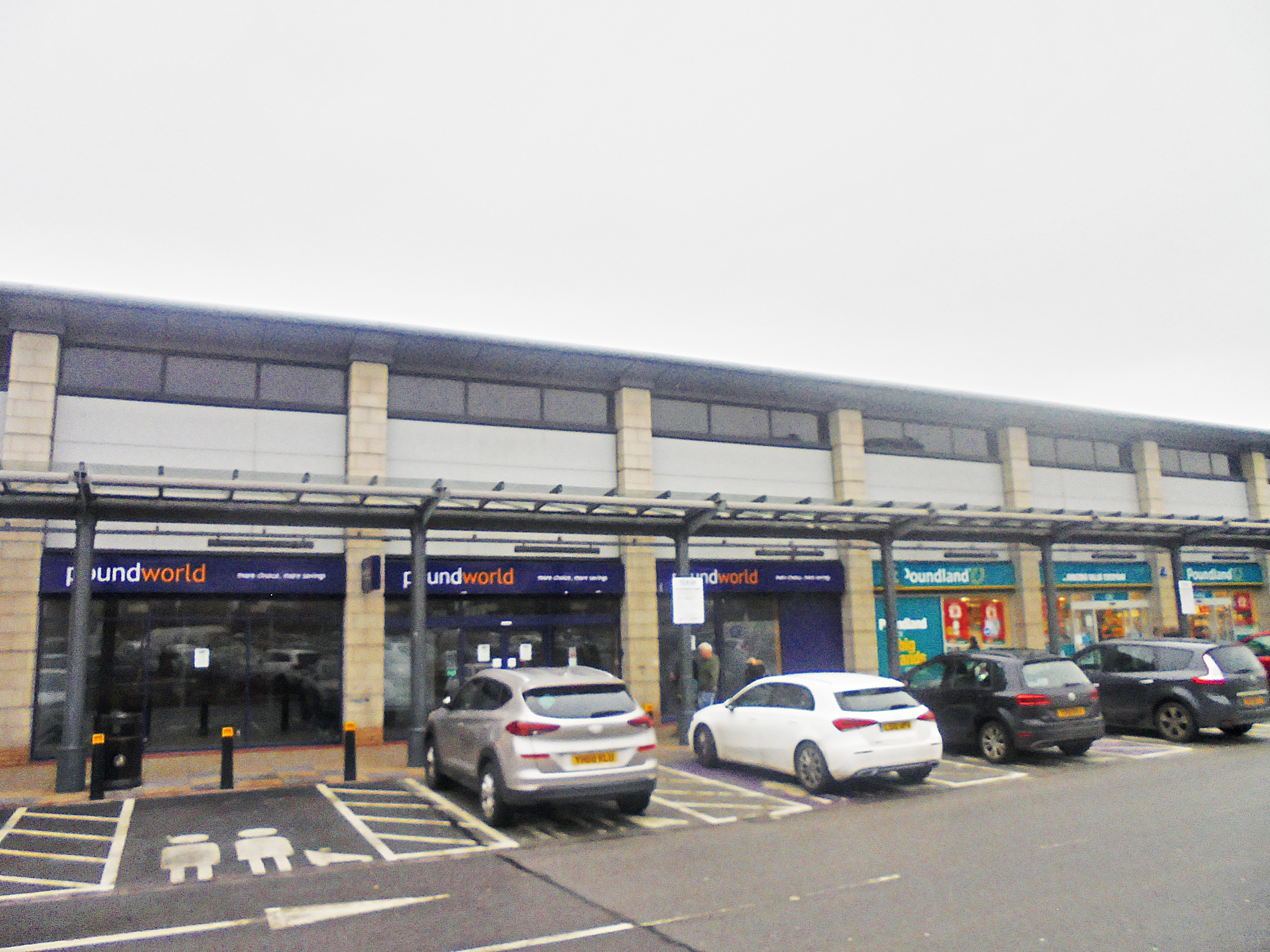
Poundworld and Poundland branches next to each other in Seacroft, Leeds.

In 2012, the company was the subject of a BBC documentary series, Pound Shop Wars, that focused on the competition between Poundworld and its rivals. After the initial hour-long pilot, the four-episode series was broadcast at the beginning of 2014. A second series of eight episodes was screened in autumn 2015.
