= What Every Woman Wants (retail chain) =

Former British chain of discount stores

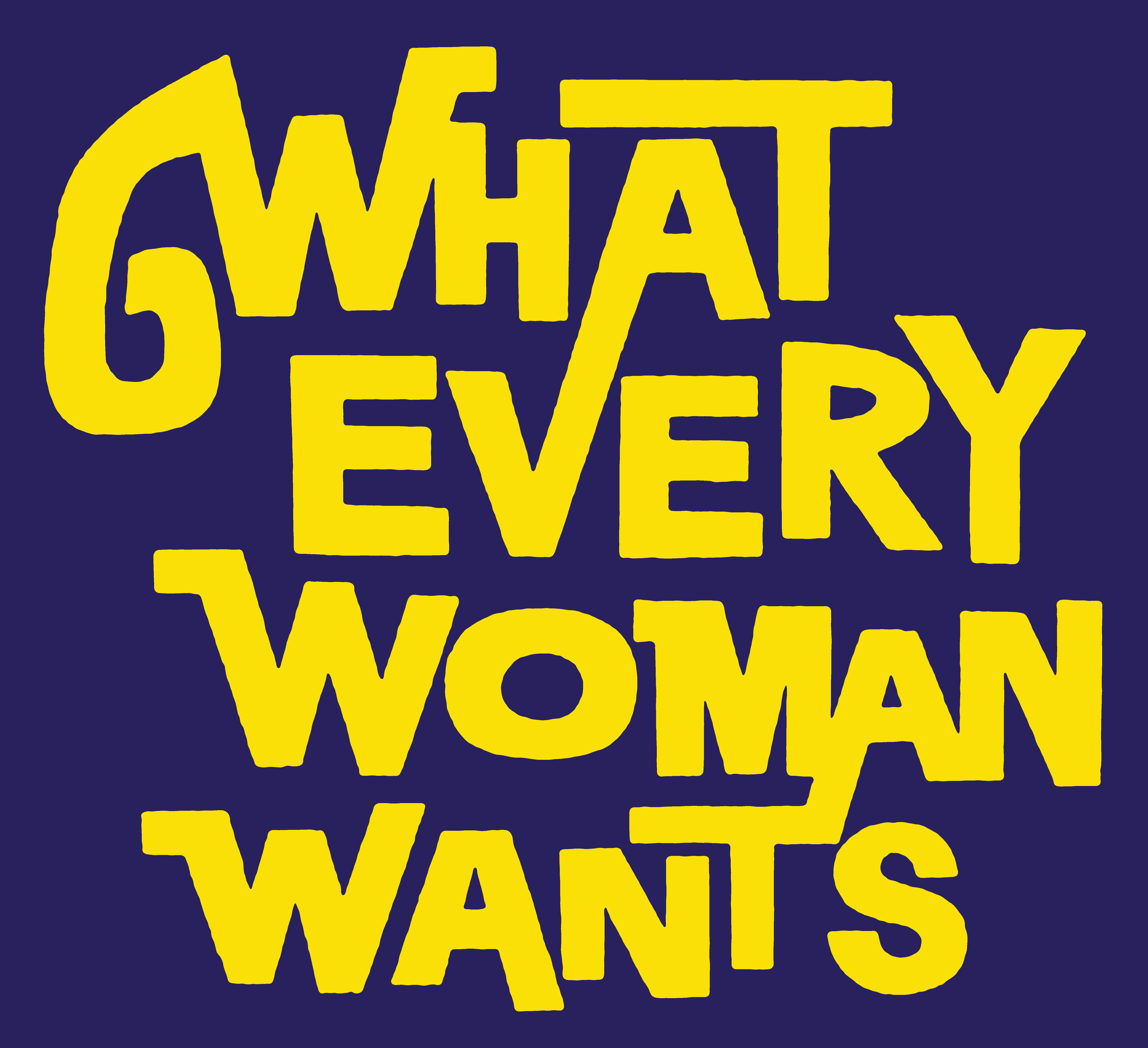
- Industry: Retail
- Founded: 1971
- Founder: Gerald Weisfeld
- Defunct: 2003
- Fate: Merged
- Headquarters: Glasgow, Scotland, United Kingdom

What Every Woman Wants (sometimes abbreviated to WEWW, and later styled as What Everyone Wants) was a British chain of discount stores. In 1971, it was founded by Vera and Gerald Weisfeld in Glasgow, and became a national chain in 1990, after being sold by the Weisfelds for £50 million to Amber Day and later in 1997 to Brown & Jackson.

== History ==
Over 130 stores were opened in Britain, in towns such as Blackburn, Leyland, Ormskirk, Hartlepool, and Swansea. Openings for What Everyone Wants and Brunswick Shoes in Accrington were planned, but never happened. Their television commercials used the hook from the song by Status Quo of 1979, "Whatever You Want".

In 1990, the Weisfelds sold What Everyone Wants to Amber Day, a company run by Philip Green. After selling, the Weisfelds founded a new discount department store in Glasgow, named Weisfelds, in 1994. Located in the old Goldbergs buildings (Goldbergs having closed in 1990), it had a similar style and range of merchandise to their original WEWW business. However, the venture failed to repeat the success of the original and closed in 1999; the buildings eventually fell into dereliction and were purchased by Selfridges who later sold the site.

The 130-store What Everyone Wants chain was sold to Tradegro in August 2002, but went into administration the following month.

It underwent numerous change of owners, including Philip Green, before Brown and Jackson took ownership at the end. When Brown and Jackson sold it to Tradegro, Daan Venter took on the role as CEO and changed the name to Everyone Wants and used the slogan 'Value, Style and Quality'. They eventually closed all stores during March 2003, after no buyers offered enough money for the administrators to agree to sell.

One of the first stores to close was the main store in Argyle Street, Glasgow, and one of the last was in Irvine, North Ayrshire.
