= Toys "R" Us UK =

British toy store chain

Toys "R" Us
- Logo used since May 2008

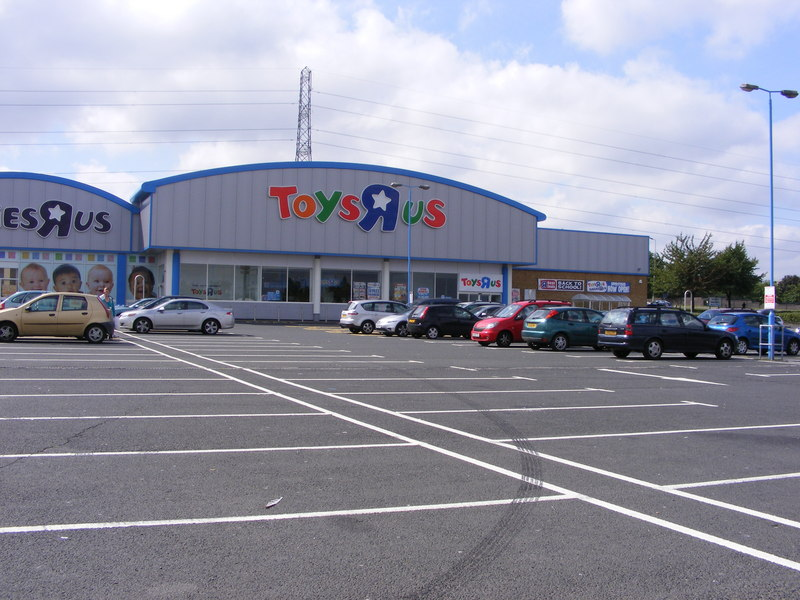
- A Toys "R" Us Store in Oldbury in 2010
- Type: Subsidiary
- Industry: Retail
- Founded: 6 September 1985; 41 years ago (original); 28 October 2021; 5 years ago (revival)
- Defunct: 24 April 2018; 8 years ago (original)
- Fate: Original stores closed, now a concession in TGJones, WHSmith and Hobbycraft stores
- Number of locations: 105 (2018)
- Parent: Toys "R" Us (1985–2018); WHP Global (2021–present)
- Website: toysrus.co.uk

Toys "R" Us is a British retailer owned by WHP Global. The UK Toys 'R' Us was established by its U.S. counterpart, with the first store opening in 1985. In 2018, the retailer closed all locations but was later revived in 2021, eventually leading to physical Toys "R" Us concessions opening in WHSmith stores. It currently has concessions in WHSmith, TGJones and Hobbycraft stores.

== History ==
Logo used from 2000 to May 2008

Logo used from 1985 to 2000

Logo used from 6 September 1985 to later 1985

The first Toys "R" Us stores in the United Kingdom opened on 6 September 1985, in Woking, Wood Green and Basildon, followed by Cardiff and Bristol just a week later At its peak, the chain had over 105 stores in the country. They were operated by Toys "R" Us Limited.

On 4 December 2017, the company reported that it would be liquidating and closing at least 26 stores in the United Kingdom as part of an insolvency restructuring known as a company voluntary arrangement.

=== Closure ===
After amassing £15 million in unpaid taxes due to Brexit, Toys "R" Us Limited entered administration on 28 February 2018, after failing to find a buyer. On 2 March 2018, it was announced that all UK stores would begin a liquidation sale, and on 14 March 2018, it was announced that all UK stores were expected to close within six weeks. On 24 April 2018, Toys "R" Us stopped trading in the United Kingdom after 32 years of service. All stores were closed by 24 April 2018.

=== Revival ===
On 28 October 2021, Toys "R" Us announced plans to reopen its UK arm, initially through online purchasing from its Australian arm, then with physical branches opening from 2022 onwards. The online store reopened the following year, and this was followed up with a deal with WHSmith to open up Toys "R" Us branded concessions inside nine WHSmith stores. Following the trial being a success, 39 more concessions will be opening. With the first 17 coming soon and are now on the Toys R Us website. The first of three new stores opened 25 May 2024. Two more stores opened on 1 June 2024. In December 2024, they expanded their deal with WHSmith to sell Geoffrey gifts on FunkyPigeon.com. Following the sale of WHSmith's high street stores the operations will change to Hobbycraft owner Modella Capital rebranding the stores to TGJones. Nine new concessions were added to nine of WHSmith's Welcome Break stores in a Toys "R" Us first. The brand will open concessions in Hobbycraft stores.
