= TGJones =

British newsagent retailer

TG Jones High Street Limited

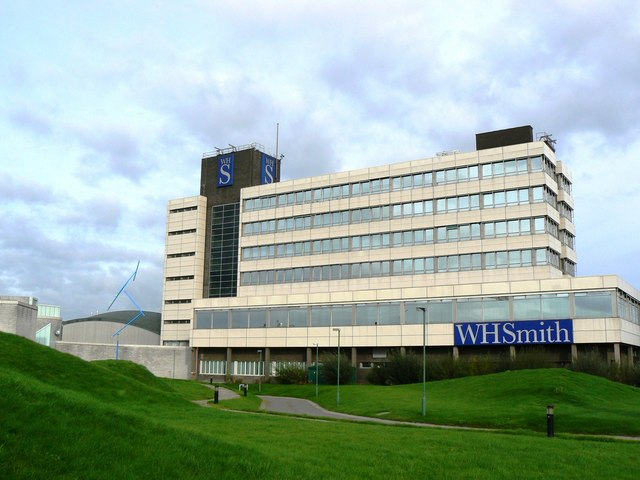
- TGJones's headquarters in the Greenbridge area of Swindon
- Trade name: TGJones
- Type: Private
- Industry: Retail
- Predecessors: WHSmith (high street retail and online businesses)
- Founded: 1792; 234 years ago (as W.H. Smith); 30 June 2025; 16 months ago (as TGJones)
- Founder: Henry Walton Smith (under WH Smith name)
- Headquarters: Greenbridge, Swindon, United Kingdom
- Number of locations: Circa 350 (November 2026)
- Area served: United Kingdom
- Key people: Alex Willson (CEO)
- Products: Books, periodicals, stationery, toys (76 under Toys "R" Us agreement)
- Owner: Modella Capital
- Parent: TG Jones High Street Holdings Limited
- Website: www.tgjonesonline.co.uk

TG Jones High Street Limited is a British newsagent, stationer and book retailer, founded in June 2025 as a result of WHSmith selling its 480-store high street retail and online businesses to Modella Capital. Modella charges the retailer a royalty fee to use the TGJones name.

In May 2026, Modella Capital announced that TGJones would close 150 of its 450 stores as part of a rescue plan. In August 2026, Mr Justice Hildyard, the judge who approved the rescue plan, described it as "[having] all the hallmarks of an adventurous equity play".

== History ==
=== Sale and transition ===
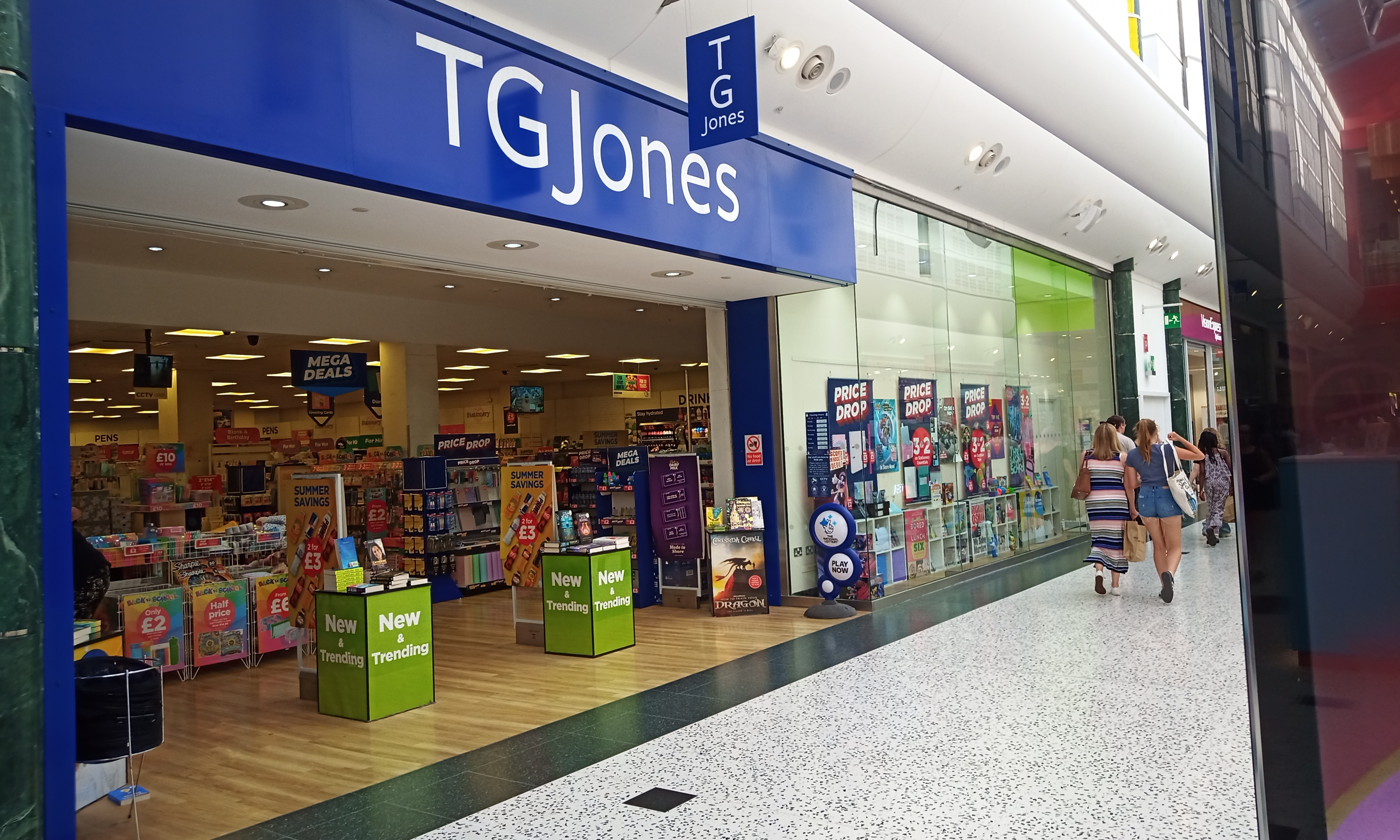
TGJones at the White Rose Centre in Leeds.

WHSmith opted to sell the business in order to focus on its larger travel retail operation which accounted for 75% of its trading revenue and 85% of its profits in the last financial year. The WHSmith brand has been retained by the WHSmith group for its travel retail shops and other activities, meaning the high street business would need to be rebranded. Despite not being related to the travel business, online card retailer Funky Pigeon was not included in the sale and was instead kept by WHSmith with the intention to sell it separately; Card Factory was the eventual buyer. Online stationery business Cult Pens was also retained by WHSmith.

At the time the sale was agreed, there were 480 WHSmith high street stores.

Following concerns from the Communication Workers Union, representing Post Office and Royal Mail staff, that the sale may cause "postal deserts" given the large proportion of branches inside the WHSmith high street stores, Modella insisted that they planned to make few changes, retaining Post Offices and Toys "R" Us sections within shops.

In May 2025, Sky News revealed that WHSmith's 12 month long transitional services agreement with Modella Capital allowed WHSmith to cancel the contract in the event of a company voluntary arrangement.

In late June 2025, before the sale to Modella Capital was officially complete, some WHSmith branches, including those in Leominster, Ross-on-Wye, and Witney, applied for planning permission to change their signs and branding to the TGJones name.

The name "TGJones" was not derived from an individual, rather was invented by Modella Capital to sound similar to "WHSmith" (named after William Henry Smith) and thereby continue the implication of being a family business. In terms of branding, TGJones is similar to WHSmith, with a similar text mark and blue-and-white colour scheme.

On 30 June 2025, WHSmith completed the sale of the business at a reduced valuation of £40 million.

On 1 July 2025, the website and social media were officially launched, as well as the first branded store in Aylesbury. At the same time, the company announced the closure of its store and Post Office franchise in The Broadway, Bradford.

On 20 November 2025, the company announced that they would be opening around 36 new stores, they would be adding Hobbycraft and Claire's (both owned by Modella, latter under licence) concessions to some stores, joining their growing concession line-up which consists of Toys "R" Us and Post Office.

On 25 November 2025, the company said that it might sell its Greenbridge HQ and distribution centre to move to a different part of Swindon.

On 6 May 2026, Modella Capital announced that "up to" 150 TGJones stores would be closed as an "essential part" of the company's restructuring.

TGJones was put up for sale in November 2026.
