= London Scottish =

London Scottish may refer to:

- London Scottish (regiment), a former regiment of the British Territorial Army, now a company of the London Regiment
- London Scottish Bank, a British bank
- London Scottish F.C., a British rugby union club
- London Scottish Golf Club, a British golf club in Wimbledon
