= ALE-HOP =

Spanish gift shop retail chain

- Company type: Private
- Industry: Retail
- Founded: 2001
- Founder: Vicent Grimalt
- Headquarters: Bellreguard, Valencian Community, Spain
- Number of locations: 336 (2024)
- Area served: Spain; Portugal; Italy; Croatia
- Key people: Darío Grimalt (CEO)
- Products: Gifts, fashion accessories, stationery, home decor
- Revenue: €254 million (2024)
- Net income: €51 million (2024)
- Owner: Family-owned
- Number of employees: 2,000+ (2024)
- Parent: Clave Dénia S.A.U.
- Website: Official website

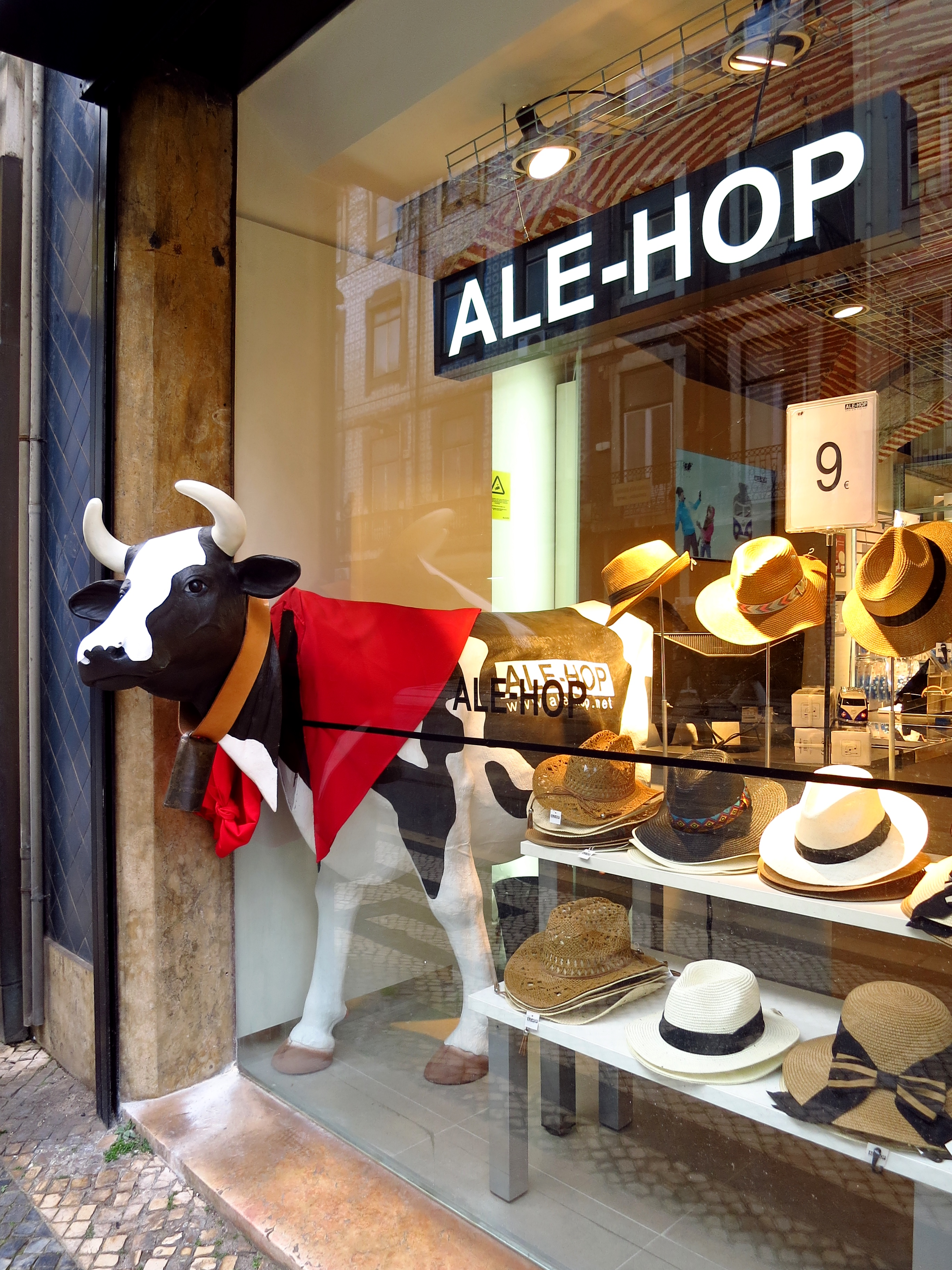
ALE-HOP store in Lisbon

ALE-HOP is a chain of variety stores in Europe based in Valencia, Spain, originally from Gata de Gorgos (Alicante). Vicente Grimalt, the founder and manager of the brand began selling products in 1968 from his hometown on the street, including carrycots and hats. In 1990 he founded Clave Denia S.A.U. dedicated to wholesale. After that Grimalt created the brand "ALE-HOP", opening the first store on Calle Paz in Valencia.

== Geographic presence ==
As of 2022 there were 270 stores in Spain, Portugal, Croatia and Mexico which are mostly corporate owned but with some franchises in Portugal, Italy and Croatia.

ALE-HOP stores (2022)
Country	Region	No. stores
Spain	Valencian Community	55
Spain	(Andalusia) Andalucía	46
Spain	(Catalonia) Cataluña	35
Spain	Canary Islands	34
Spain	(Basque Country (autonomous community)) Basque Country	13
Spain	(Community of Madrid) Comunidad de Madrid	11
Spain	Balearic Islands	9
Spain	(Castile and León) Castille and León	7
Spain	Region of Murcia	5
Spain	(Galicia (Spain)) Galicia	4
Spain	La Rioja	2
Spain	(Aragon) Aragón	2
Spain	Cantabria	2
Spain	(Castilla–La Mancha) Castilla-La Mancha	1
Spain	Total in Spain	226

ALE-HOP stores (2022)
Country	Region	No. stores
Portugal	Mainland	37
Portugal	Madeira	4
Croatia	Split	1
Croatia	Zadar	1
Croatia	Zagreb	1
Italy	Bergamo	1
Italy	Cesenatico	1
Italy	Ravenna	1
Total outside Spain		47
Total worldwide		273

== Legal matters and criticism ==
In 2022 a Valencia commercial court dismissed a claim by rival brand Mr. Wonderful alleging ALE-HOP's designs unlawfully imitated its "feel-good" style, finding the aesthetic was a general trend not exclusively protectable.

In 2018 the Spanish nursing union SATSE asked ALE-HOP to withdraw a “nurse” novelty pen on the grounds it promoted a sexist image, a request that received mainstream press coverage.

== See also ==
- Flying Tiger Copenhagen
- MINISO
