= William Henry Smith (bookseller, born 1792) =

English entrepreneur

William Henry Smith (7 July 1792 – 28 July 1865) was an English entrepreneur whose business included both newsagents and book shops. He was born at Little Thurlow, Suffolk, but ran his business in London, where he died. The family business evolved into the chain W H Smith.

== Early life and career ==
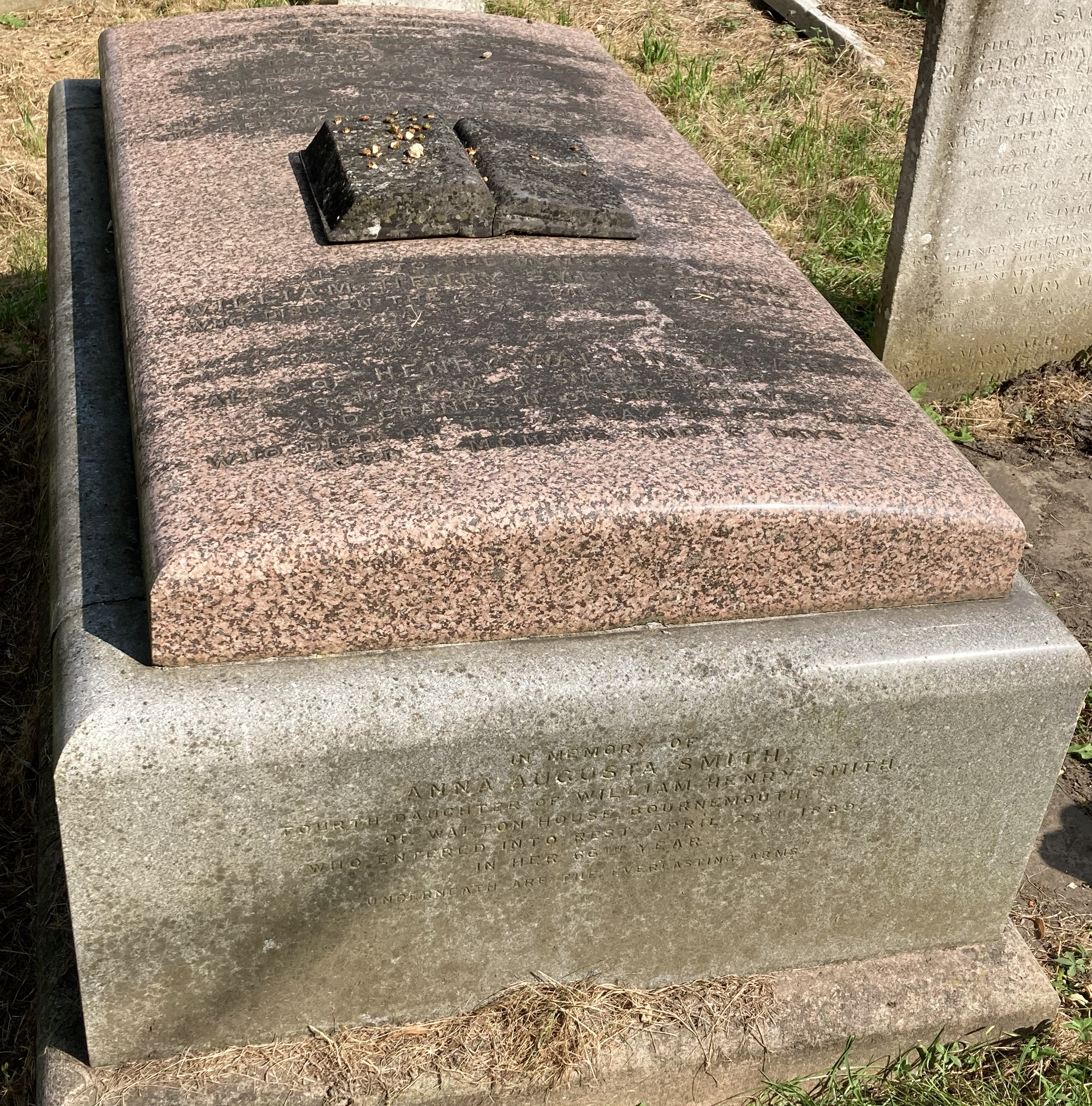
Family vault of William Henry Smith in Kensal Green Cemetery

Born the son of Henry Walton Smith and Anna Eastaugh, William Henry Smith was brought up by his mother following the death of his father when he was only a few weeks old. His parents established a news vendor in Little Grosvenor Street, London, the precursor of W H Smith in 1792.

In 1812, following the death of Zaccheus Coates, a business associate of his mother, he went into the family business in partnership with his mother and his brother. In 1816 his mother died and the business was equally divided between him and his brother Henry Edward Smith. William proved the more capable businessman of the two, and the firm became known as W H Smith. After his father's death, the business was valued at £1,280 (about ~£54731 in 2012, adjusted by inflation).

In 1846, he admitted his son as a partner, and the firm became W H Smith & Son. Book stalls at railway stations proved an especially successful endeavour.

== Death ==
William Henry Smith died on 28 July 1865. He is buried at Kensal Green Cemetery, London.

== Family ==
In 1817, William Henry married Mary Ann Cooper, a rigorous practitioner of Wesley's Protestantism: they married at St George's, Hanover Square and eventually they had eight children: seven girls, and one boy, who was also named William Henry Smith.

== Legacy ==
The newsagents business founded by his father continued after Smith's death under the leadership of his son, William Henry junior. The firm W.H. Smith & Son remained in the Smith family hands until 1928, and continued as a major high street retailer into the early 21st century. In 2025, upon the acquisition of the firm's high street outlets by the private equity firm Modella Capital, it was announced that the WHSmith brand would be dropped in favour of a fictitious family name, TGJones. WHSmith plc continues to run its retail outlets at airports, railway stations and hospital outlets, where Smith family name has been retained.

A marble bust of William Henry Smith by the sculptor Joseph Durham is in the collection of the Russell-Cotes Art Gallery & Museum in Bournemouth.
