= WHSmith =

British travel retailer

WH Smith plc
- Formerly: Pollquote Limited (2004–2006); New WH Smith plc (June–August 2006)
- Type: Public
- Traded as: LSE: SMWH; FTSE 250 component
- Industry: Retail
- Founded: 1792; 234 years ago in London, England
- Founder: Henry Walton Smith
- Successor: TGJones (high street retail and online businesses)
- Headquarters: London, England
- Number of locations: 593 (UK Travel); 687 (International Travel) (Note: As of 31 August 2025)
- Area served: Worldwide
- Key people: Leo Quinn (Executive Chairman)
- Brands: InMotion; District Market; Flight Stop; Lick; Marshall Rousso; Root & Branch; Tech Express; curi.o.city; iStore; Cult Pens
- Revenue: ▲£1,553 million (2025)
- Operating income: ▼£148 million (2025)
- Net income: ▼£(137) million (2025)
- Number of employees: 14,235 (2025)
- Subsidiaries: Marshall Retail Group
- Website: whsmithplc.co.uk

WH Smith plc is a British travel retailer, operating in Europe, North America, the Asia Pacific and the Middle East. Predominantly operating in airports, railway stations, hospitals and motorway service stations, the company is best known as a retailer of refreshments, books, and entertainment. The company trades under a number of brands, mainly WHSmith and InMotion.

Formed by Henry Walton Smith and his wife Anna in 1792 as a news vendor in London, the company remained under the ownership of the Smith family for many years and saw large-scale expansion during the 1970s as it began to diversify into other retail categories. Following a rejected private equity takeover in 2004, the company began to focus on its core high street and travel businesses. In July 2025, the company sold its 480 high street locations to Modella Capital, who rebranded them as TGJones.

In the 1960s, the company facilitated the creation of the SBN book identifier, which later became the internationally-used ISBN.

WHSmith is listed on the London Stock Exchange and is a constituent of the FTSE 250 Index.

== History ==
=== Formation ===
The WHSmith logo from 1973 to the mid-1990s, featuring the then-familiar cube of letters. This was briefly revived on special bags and merchandise to mark the firm's 225th anniversary in 2017.

In 1792, Henry Walton Smith and his wife Anna established the business as a news vendor in Little Grosvenor Street, London. After their deaths, the business — valued in 1812 at £1,280 (equivalent to £78,707 in 2025) — was taken over by their youngest son William Henry Smith, and in 1846 the firm became W. H. Smith & Son when his only son, also named William Henry, became a partner. The firm took advantage of the railway boom by opening news-stands on railway stations, beginning with Euston in 1848. In 1850, the firm opened depots in Birmingham, Manchester and Liverpool. It also ran a circulating library service, from 1860 to 1961, and a publishing business based at the Steam Press, Cirencester. The younger W. H. Smith used the success of the firm as a springboard into politics, becoming a Member of Parliament (MP) in 1868 and serving as a minister in several Conservative governments.

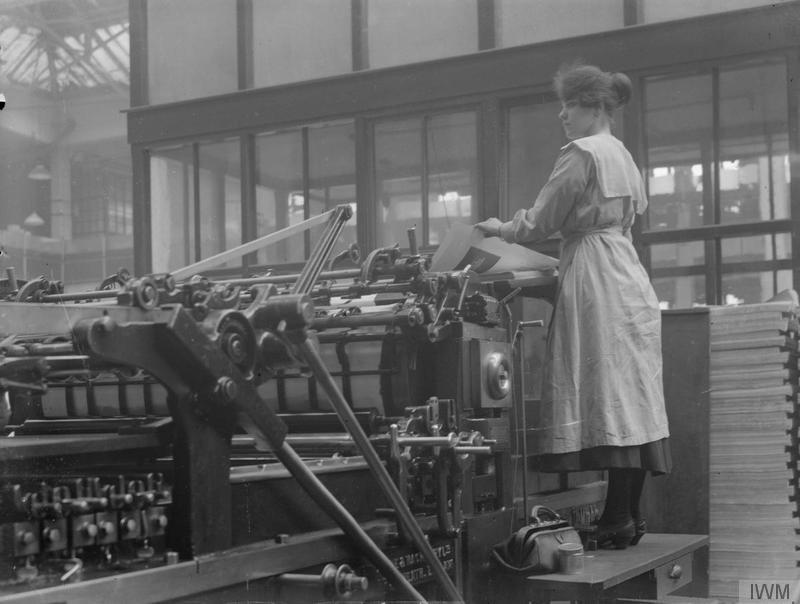
A worker operating a laying machine in the printing works of WH Smith & Sons, Stamford Street, Southwark, 1918

After the death of W. H. Smith the younger in 1891, his widow was created Viscountess Hambleden in her own right; their son inherited the business from his father and the viscountcy from his mother. After the death of the second Viscount in 1928, the business was reconstituted as a limited company, in which his son, the third Viscount, owned all the ordinary shares. On the death of the third Viscount in 1948, the death duties were so large that a public holding company had to be formed and shares sold to WH Smith staff and the public. A younger brother of the third Viscount remained chairman until 1972, but the Smith family's control slipped away, and the last family member left the board in 1996.

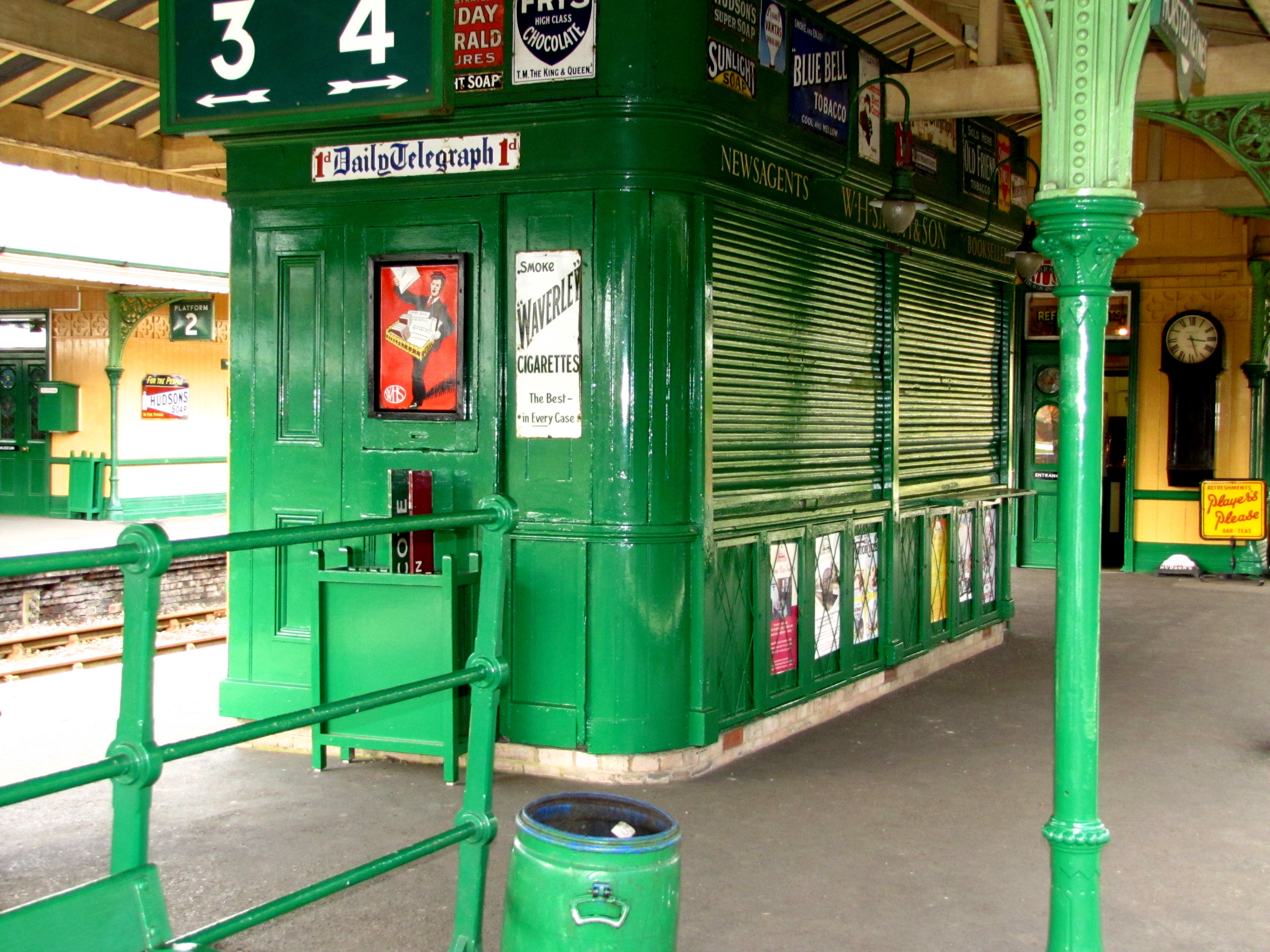
Stall on Horsted Keynes station platform, Sussex, preserved by the Bluebell Railway

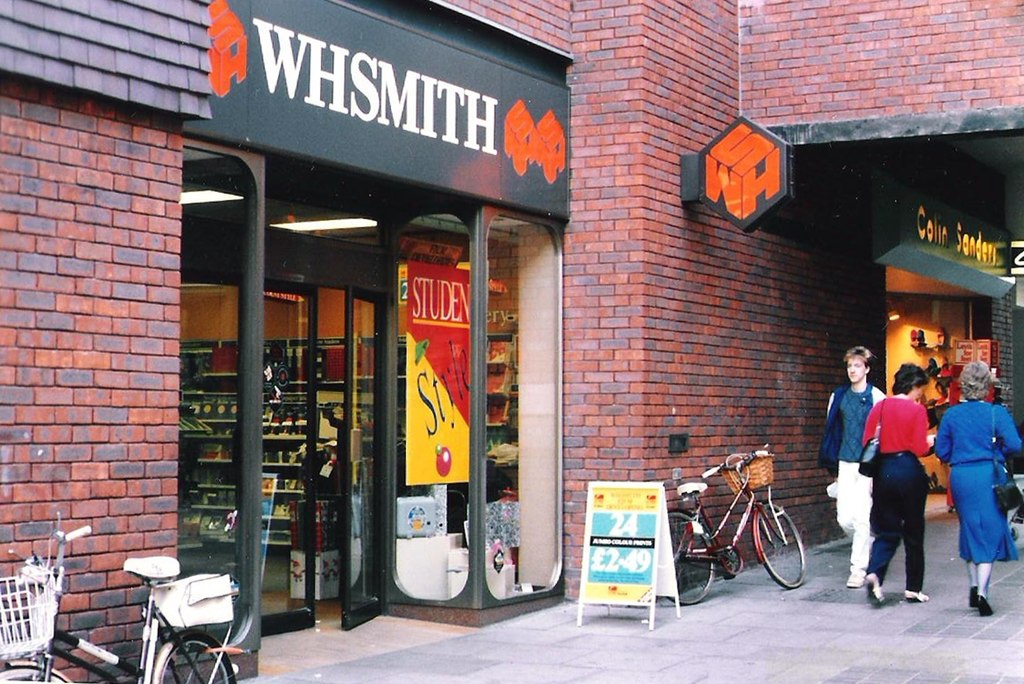
WHSmith bearing the former logo in Huntingdon, England, in 1986

In the 1960s, as other retailers shifted to digital stock management, WHSmith required a new system to catalogue books. Following negotiations with The Publishers Association, the company hired Irish statistician Gordon Foster as a consultant, who in 1966 created a nine-digit code for uniquely referencing books called Standard Book Numbering or SBN. By 1967 it was in public use, and was later adopted as the International Organisation for Standardisation ISO 2108 in 1970. This was operational until 1974, when it was finally adapted to become the ISBN.

=== Expansion ===
From the 1970s, WHSmith began to expand into other retail sectors. Their travel agency WH Smith Travel operated from 1973 to 1991. The Do It All chain of DIY shops originated with an acquisition in 1979, becoming a joint venture with Boots in 1990; Boots acquired WHSmith's share in June 1996. The bookshop chain Waterstone's, founded by former WHSmith executive Tim Waterstone in 1982, was bought in 1989 and sold in 1998.

The expanding WHSmith group adopted a new "house style" or corporate identity in 1973, with a new logo and a change of name from W. H. Smith & Son to WHSmith. The new hexagon-shaped logo featured the initials of the group on the sides of a box employing a new orange and brown colour scheme, replacing a logo that had been in use since before 1830. This updated visual identity extended throughout the company's operations, specified by a design manual, covering everything from the appropriate use of the logo in retail environments, through the design of decorative elements on wrapping paper and promotional material, the layout of stationery, labels and forms, and even crockery, also informing the design of staff uniforms and packaging.

In 1986, WHSmith bought a 75% controlling share of the Our Price music retail chain; in the 1990s it bought other music retailers, including the Virgin Group's smaller (non-Megastore) shops. The 75% share of Virgin Our Price was sold to Virgin Retail Group Ltd in July 1998 for £145m. WHSmith also owned the American record chain The Wall, which was sold to Camelot Music in 1998.

In March 1998, the company acquired John Menzies's retail outlets for £68m, which for many years had been the main rival to the company's railway-station outlets. This purchase also cleared the way for WHSmith's retail expansion into Scotland. Prior to the takeover, Menzies's larger Scottish shops (carrying a very similar range of products to High Street WHSmith shops elsewhere) dominated the market, and the latter's presence was minimal.

=== Restructuring ===
For several years, the company's retail arm had difficulties competing with specialist book and music chains on one side and large supermarkets on the other. This led to poor financial performance, and a takeover bid in 2004 by Permira, which fell through due to a shortfall in WHSmith's pension fund. The company reacted to this by disposing of its overseas subsidiaries and its publishing business Hodder Headline, in order to concentrate on reforming its core businesses.

In August 2006, the company demerged the retail and news distribution arms of the business into two separate companies: WH Smith plc (retail) and Smiths News plc (newspaper and magazine distribution). In September 2010, WHSmith bought The Gadget Shop from The Entertainer. That year, it also bought online greeting card retailer Funky Pigeon.

On 19 June 2009, WHSmith apologised after their Lewisham branch promoted a book on cellar rapist Josef Fritzl, who held his daughter Elisabeth captive for 24 years and repeatedly raped her during this period, as one of the "Top 50 Books for Dad" as a Father's Day gift. When asked for comment, WHSmith clarified that this was "a mistake by one store" and not a national promotion.

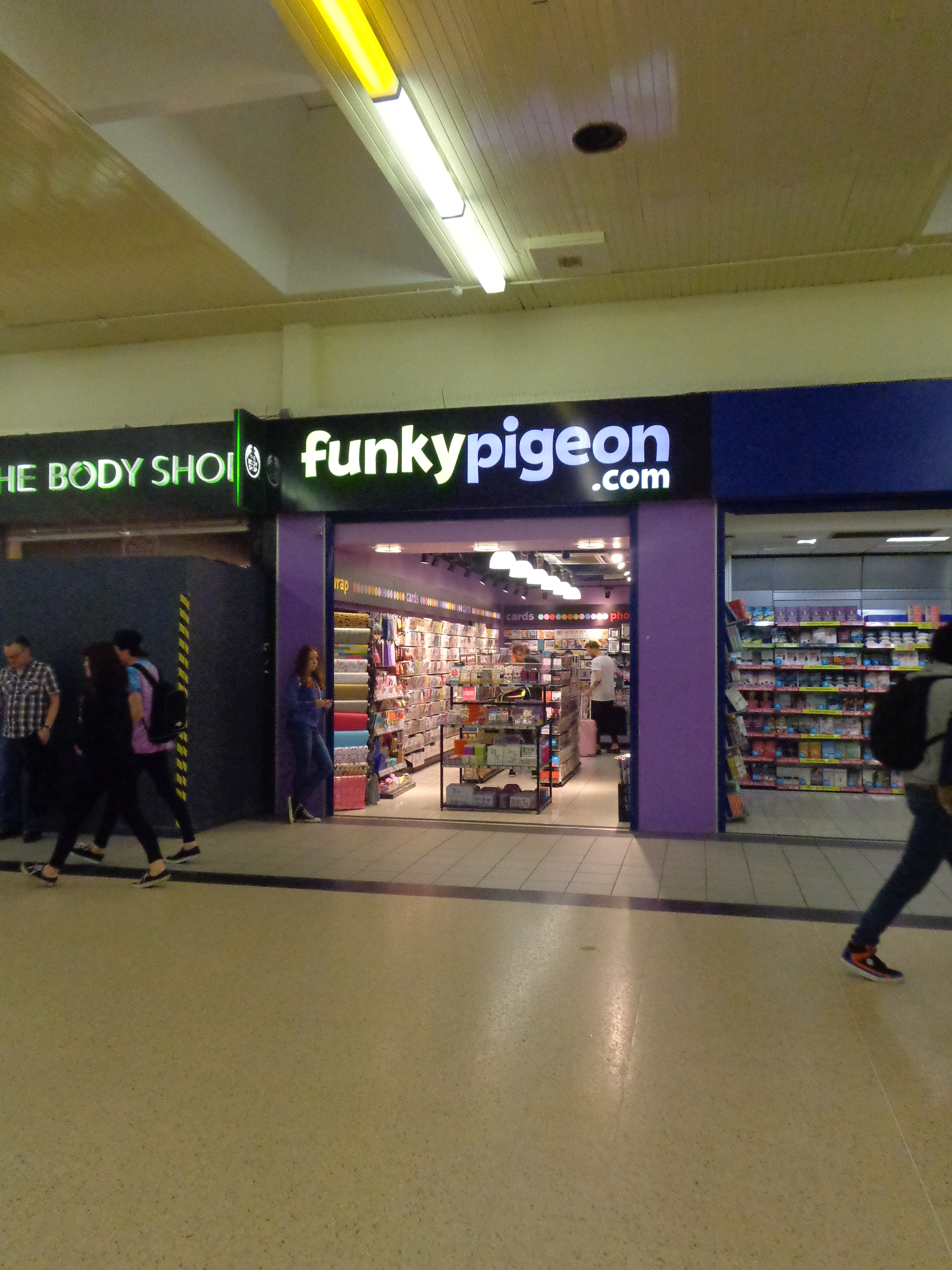
A WHSmith-owned Funky Pigeon shop at Leeds railway station

In April 2011, WHSmith agreed a deal with the legal services provider QualitySolicitors under which QualitySolicitors would place representatives in up to 500 of its UK branches. Past Times went into administration in January 2012, and the brand name was bought by WHSmith in March 2013.

In October 2012, WHSmith faced criticism from shooters after the sale of shooting magazines to children under 14 was banned, although it is legal for children under 14 to go shooting. The decision appeared to follow a campaign by animal rights activists. The British Association for Shooting and Conservation (BASC) campaigned against the ban, including a 12,000+ signature petition. In mid-November it emerged that the restrictions had been removed from all UK shooting magazines.

In October 2013, WHSmith announced that it had bought the ModelZone brand and would sell products under this brand through existing WHSmith shops. In October 2014, WHSmith announced as part of its preliminary statement that it was planning on extending its greetings card offering by launching the low-price brand Cardmarket on a trial basis. According to the statement, these trial shops would be in low rent areas and let to WHSmith under short-term leases. The company announced in late 2018 that the trial of Cardmarket would be wound up, with the closure of the Cardmarket shops. This was in addition to the announcement of the closure for at least six WHSmith shops which were deemed economically unviable following a strategic business review.

In October 2013, WHSmith also took their website offline because "unacceptable titles were appearing". These were e-books with themes of abuse.

The chain was criticised in 2014 for the condition of its shops, with both analysts and customers accusing the company of under-investing in its estate.

=== Since 2015 ===
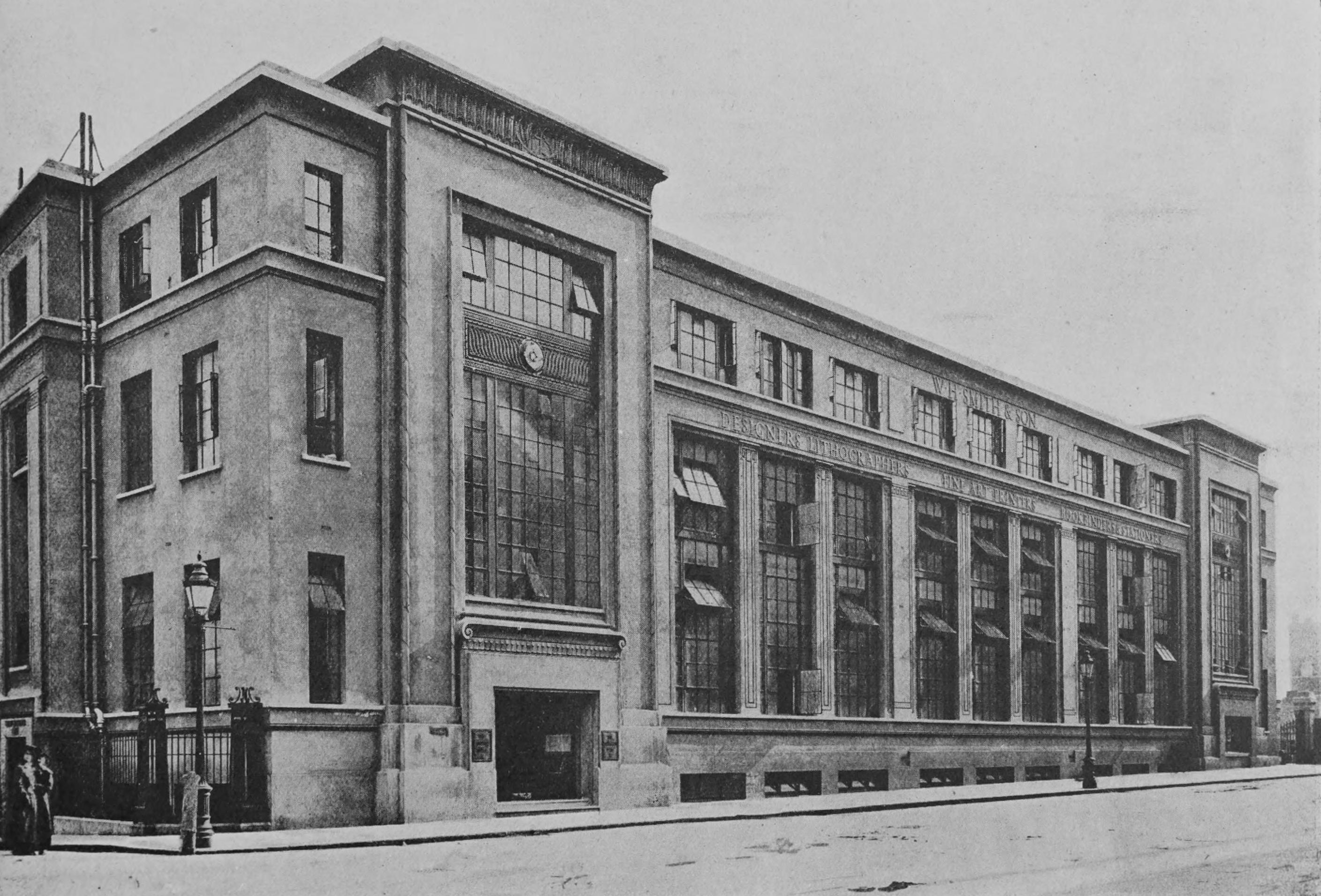
The company's 1916 building at 127 Stamford Street, designed by C. Stanley Peach

In 2015, an investigation by The Independent found that WHSmith and other airport retailers were charging VAT to shoppers travelling outside the European Union, then claiming the VAT back from the UK government and not passing the refund on to customers. This was made possible by the practice of scanning customer's boarding passes at the till point – solely for the benefit of the company – which made the passengers unwitting accomplices in their own deception. After a public outcry, a customer revolt in which many refused to hand over their boarding passes, and an intervention by Parliament, the company confirmed in March 2017 that it would pass on the VAT reduction to customers spending over £6, who were travelling outside the EU.

In 2015, the company was criticised for the prices charged in its branches in hospitals, after media investigations found some items to be on sale at significantly higher prices than in High Street branches. In May 2018, WHSmith apologised after it was revealed that it had made more than £700 by selling tubes of toothpaste for £7.99 through its branch in Pinderfields Hospital, Wakefield. The price was described as an 'error' and WHSmith promised that the proceeds from the sales would be donated to a local charity. The price was restored to £2.49, still more than three times the price of 80p charged in a nearby Tesco.

Late in 2017, the company purchased Cult Pens, a UK-based online retailer of specialist pens, for an undisclosed amount.

In 2018, WHSmith acquired the brand InMotion, the largest airport-based electronics retailer in the US. InMotion expanded to operate shops within UK airports including Heathrow, Manchester and Birmingham, as well as overseas in Spain and Australia.

In July 2020, WHSmith announced more than 150 redundancies at its head office, representing approximately 18% of the head office workforce. In November 2020, the company announced that, after a loss of £280 million, it had decided to close 25 shops, noting that eight had been closed in 2019.

In August 2020, WHSmith launched a new flagship shop in Terminal 2 at Heathrow Airport, in collaboration with Well, which features an in-house pharmacy.

In June 2023, the company was found to have broken the minimum wage law, having failed to pay around £1 million to 17,607 of its workers. The company said that this was because of an error related to its uniform policy, with a spokesperson stating: "Following a review with HMRC in 2019, and in common with a number of retailers, it was brought to our attention that we had misinterpreted how the statutory wage regulations were applied to our uniform policy for staff working in our stores. This was a genuine error and it was rectified immediately with all colleagues reimbursed in 2019".

WHSmith announced in June 2023 that it would not be opening any more shops on High Streets in the UK and would instead add outlets in airports, railway stations and in the United States and Europe. Also in June, toy retailer Toys "R" Us announced plans to open nine concessions in WHSmith shops, marking the return of the brand's physical presence in the UK after its own premises closed in 2018.

In December 2023, the logo was changed as part of a rebranding trial. The changed shops, which included those in York, Canterbury and Preston, dropped the word "Smith" in favour of "WHS".

=== Focus on travel retail ===
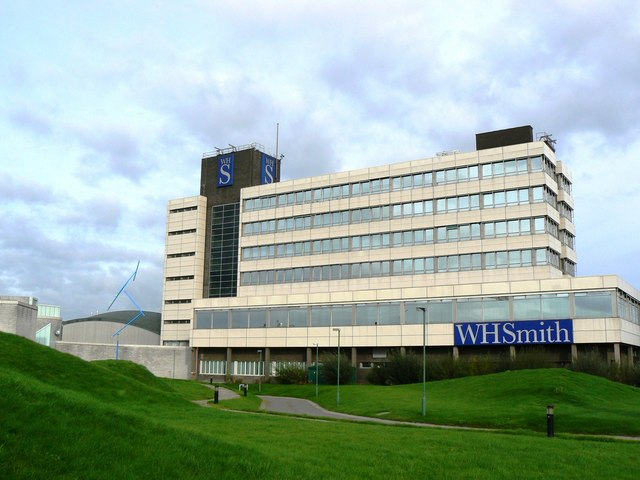
The former WHSmith headquarters building in the Greenbridge area of Swindon is now the headquarters for TGJones and additional offices for WHSmith.

In January 2025, WHSmith was reported to be in talks to sell its high street business, with around 500 shops, the website and the partnership with Toys "R" Us. The more profitable travel retail business (which has outlets in railway stations, airports, ports, hospitals and on motorways), the brand and Funky Pigeon would be unaffected by this. The company said that, in the previous financial year, it had derived 85% of its revenues from its travel operations.

In March 2025, WHSmith announced that it was selling its high street business to Modella Capital. The sale was completed in June 2025 for a reported price of "up to £40 million". The shops were rebranded to TGJones, whilst the current operator retains the WHSmith brand for its travel business. Following concerns from the Communication Workers Union (CWU), representing Post Office and Royal Mail staff, that the sale may cause "postal deserts" given the large proportion of branches inside WHSmith shops, Modella stated they planned to make few changes, retaining Post Offices and Toys "R" Us sections within shops.

In June 2025, following weaker than expected performance, WHSmith said the expected gross proceeds from the sale had decreased from £52 million to £40 million. In August 2025, WHSmith completed the sale of Funky Pigeon to Card Factory for £24 million.

In July 2025, WHSmith signed a deal to open eight outlets at the new international terminal at John F. Kennedy airport, New York. The next month, the company announced that North American profit forecasts had been overstated by about £30 million, resulting in about a £600 million one-day fall (about 35%) in its share price. An investigation by Deloitte into the circumstances was initiated. The result of the review was announced in November 2025, citing a "target-driven performance culture" and a "limited level of group oversight of the finance processes in North America", and leading to the resignation of group CEO Carl Cowling with immediate effect. Andrew Harrison, CEO of the group's UK division, was promoted to Group CEO on an interim basis until Leo Quinn was appointed as Executive Chair in April 2026.

== Television ==
WHSmith founded one of the UK's earliest cable television channels, Lifestyle, which was carried on almost every cable system in the UK and Ireland prior to the start of Sky Television in 1989. By late 1984, the company had bought a 15% stake in Screensport and from January 1986, took over the operations and management when ABC and R Kennedy pulled out. Both channels were closed in 1993.

== Operations ==
=== United Kingdom ===
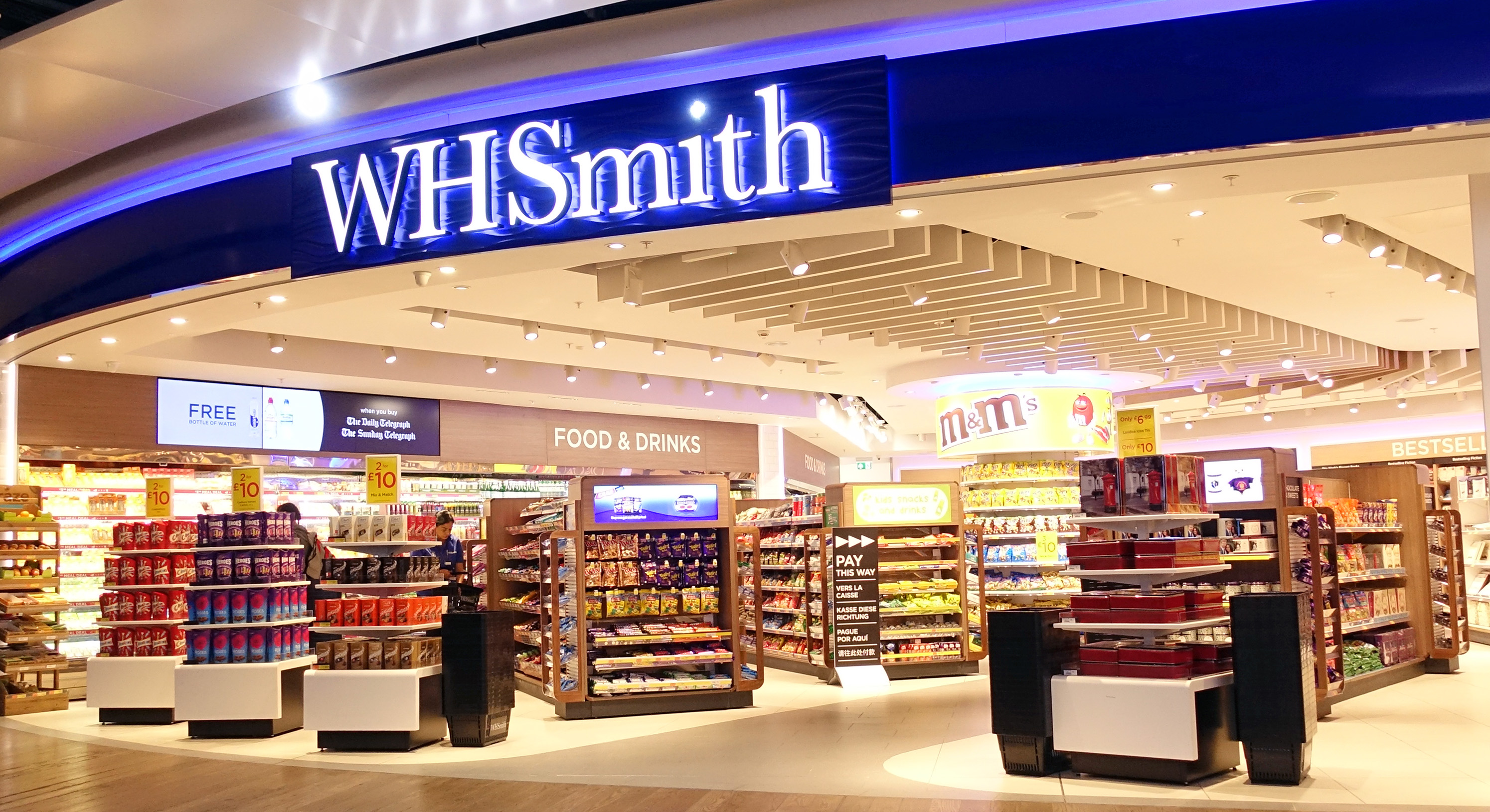
WHSmith at Heathrow Airport

Since 2007, the company has taken on a number of Post Office branches, mainly within its High Street shops. By April 2016, this had reached 107, including former Crown Post Offices, with plans for an additional 61.

WHSmith also operate a number of shops within hospitals, following its acquisition of Yorkshire-based newsagent chain United News in March 2008.

In addition to its joint ventures and franchise shops, the company trialled the smaller format, convenience-based 'WHSmith Local' concept during 2013. Targeted at independent newsagents and post office business owners, 40 such shops were trading and a further 40 were planned by the time of the 2015 annual report.

Since 2011, the company has also opened shops using its Funky Pigeon brand and subsidiary Funky Pigeon.com Ltd which offers stationery and personalised greetings cards. In 2024, WHSmith announced that they had reached an exclusive agreement with Toys R Us owner WHP Global to open Toys R Us concessions inside its stores.

=== International ===
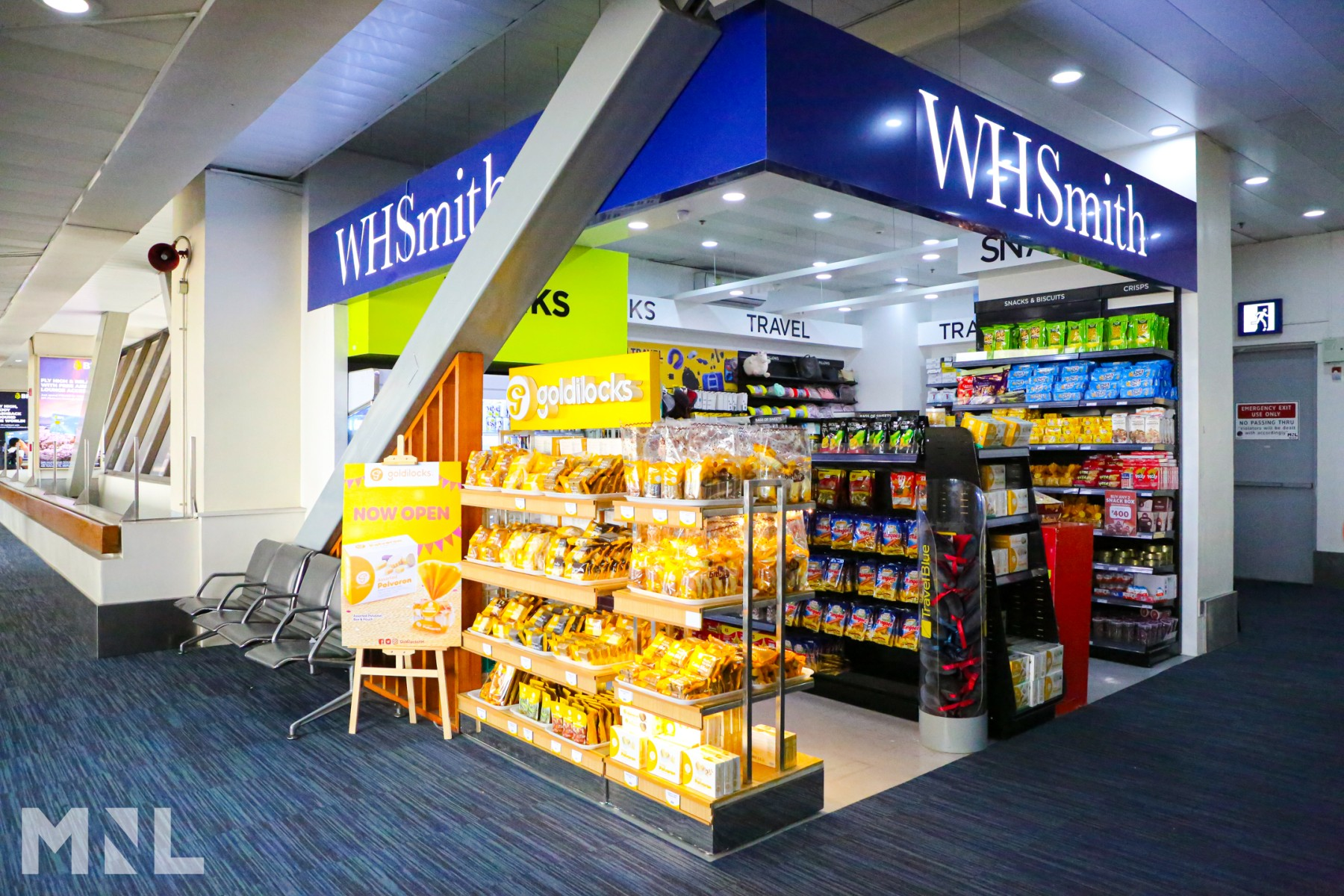
WHSmith at Ninoy Aquino International Airport, Manila, in 2023

Canadian operations initially began in 1950. By 1970, there were 14 stores in Canada. They continued until 1989, when they were sold to domestic owners and renamed SmithBooks. The business later merged with Coles, forming Chapters, which retained the Coles and SmithBooks names and locations while also opening new namesake superstores. Many SmithBooks locations were eventually closed or converted to Coles; a few locations retained the name as of 2013.

In 2018, WHSmith re-entered the Canadian and American markets through its acquisition of Airport Electronics Retailer InMotion, followed by Marshall Retail Group in 2019. As of 2024, WHSmith owns 320 stores in North America.

By 1970, WHSmith had one retail store in both Brussels and Paris. The company retained one shop on Rue de Rivoli in the centre of Paris, which was sold in 2020 and by 2022 had been re-branded as Smith & Son. The branch in Brussels became Waterstones in 1997.

The company acquired Whitcoulls and Bennetts in New Zealand and Angus & Robertson in Australia in 2001, with plans to convert Whitcoulls to WHSmith. By 2004 these operations had been sold, along with those in Hong Kong International Airport (now Page One) and in Singapore at Changi Airport (now Times Travel under the Times Bookstores banner).

WHSmith restarted its Australian operations in March 2011 following the collapse of Angus & Robertson/Borders who held the naming rights in Australia. The first new shop was opened at Melbourne Airport, in the international departures terminal. Two more outlets opened at Melbourne Airport, three at Southern Cross railway station and one within Melbourne Central. The shop at Melbourne Central closed in 2014 and the shop at Southern Cross closed in 2025.

WHSmith has opened shops in major Indian airports. In 2014, WHSmith began to sponsor the IPL cricket team Sunrisers Hyderabad.

In October 2008, WHSmith, together with SSP, opened five branches within Copenhagen Airport, and in April 2009, opened a branch in Stockholm-Arlanda Airport. In 2009, WHSmith opened two shops in Shannon Airport, County Clare, Ireland. A further three shops are operated in Dublin Airport's Terminal Two, which opened in November 2010, and five shops in Dublin Airport's Terminal One, which opened in 2013. The chain promised when winning this latter contract to hire a full-time Irish book buyer; however, the appointment of an Australian, based in London and not in Dublin, drew criticism.

In 2013, it opened an additional four shops at Dublin Airport's Terminal 1. Eason's, currently at T1 in Dublin, asked the airport operator to tender for a new contract one year earlier as the retailer blamed a fall in sales on the success of Terminal 2 at Dublin, which carried the majority of long haul traffic; these passengers tend to spend more on books.

WHSmith opened four branches in Helsinki Airport, Finland in late 2016 and early 2017.

The company has a shop in Malta International Airport which was opened in 2016 under a franchise agreement with Miller Distributors.

== See also ==
- Retail Book Association
- Books in the United Kingdom
