= Ambrose Bowden Johns =

- Born: 1776; Plymouth
- Died: 10 December 1858 (aged 81–82); Plymouth

Ambrose Bowden Johns (1776 – 10 December 1858) was a British artist based in Plymouth whose work was in a similar style to his friend Turner. His house was base for artistic activity in Plymouth where he encouraged local artists including Benjamin Robert Haydon and Samuel Prout.

== Biography ==
Johns was born in Plymouth, but nothing is known of him until he was training as a printer and publisher for the father of the history painter Benjamin Haydon who shared the same name as his son. Johns' landscape painting skills were encouraged by his friendship with Haydon, Turner and later local artist Charles Eastlake. Johns became a member of the Plymouth Society of Artists and Amateurs and would invite artists to stay. Turner stayed with him during the summer of 1813. Turner and Johns went on sketching trips together.

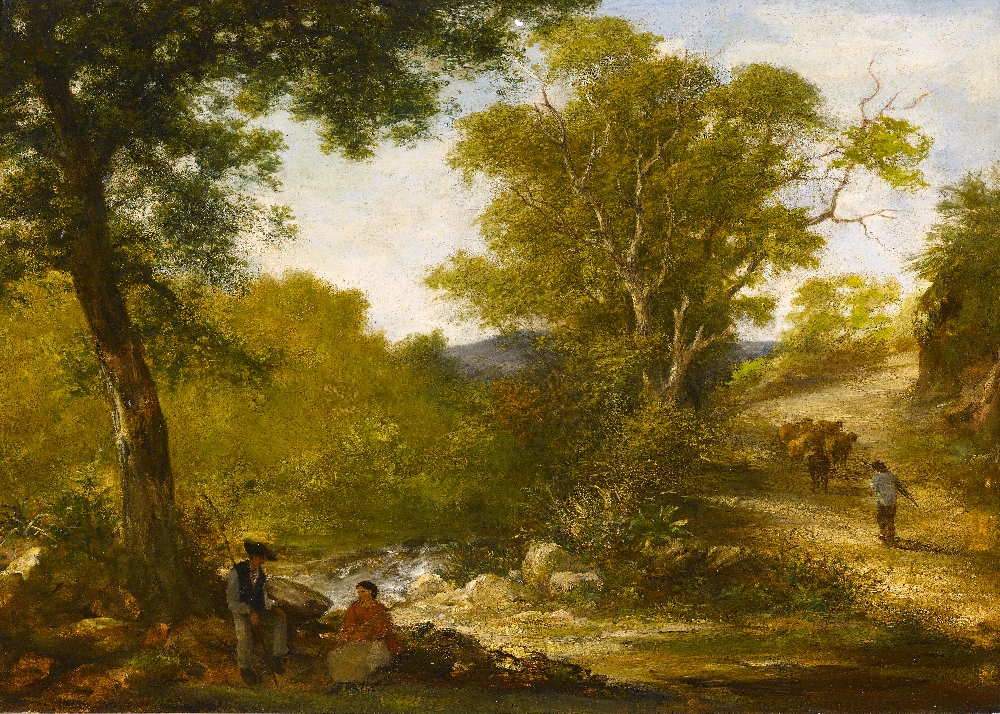
"Devon Landscape"

In 1807 Johns described his profession as bookseller when he successfully applied for a patent which covered the manufacture and composition of an external paint for houses. Regretfully Johns pictures can be frequently recognised by their dark colour as he is said to have used too much asphaltum. which was not lightfast.

Johns and Turner's styles were similar and Johns made a painting box by hand for his sketching partner. There are examples in John's sketchbooks of studies he made based on Turner's work. This friendship was damaged when a painting by Johns, that was owned by the influential art critic Samuel Carter Hall, was engraved and published and erroneously attributed to Turner. The publishers did print a correction and apology in the newspapers but this still did not prevent the same painting being sold at Christie's still with an incorrect attribution to Turner. Johns exhibited at prestigious exhibitions in London including the Royal Academy. Despite this exposure his work was later confused with Turner's on two other occasions. Turner is said to have "tired of Johns' copying" although they were still acquaintances in 1840.

Johns and his wife Rebecca had five children at their home of North Hill Cottage in Plymouth. The house was a centre for local artistic culture and was visited by aspiring local artists like Haydon and Samuel Prout. Johns worked as a drawing master and he organised local exhibitions and founded a local sketching society. Johns continued to experiment with paint and he was awarded another patent for an undercoat used to prepare materials for additional treatment in 1839.

The youngest of Johns children, John Johns is presumed to have been sent to Edinburgh University because he was a Presbyterian. He went on to be a Unitarian minister and a notable missionary.

Johns died in Plymouth. He has a number of paintings in national ownership and several at Plymouth City Museum and Art Gallery. An exhibition of his work was held in Australia in 1979 and a recent sale of a sketchbook raised €22,844.
