= Jamie Constable =

British private equity financier

Jamie Constable (born 1964) is a British private equity financier. He is the owner and chairman of Hay Wain Group, which owns Modella Capital.

Constable trained as an accountant with Touche Ross, and is a Fellow of the Chartered Institute of Certified Accountants. He later founded RJP a firm of chartered tax advisors and accountants.

Constable and Peter Ward were the co-founders and owners of R Capital, and in 2007, they paid £9m to take Little Chef out of administration.

In April 2009, R Capital (with Constable as its managing director) acquired Morses Club, a doorstep lending business for people with poor credit histories, from the collapsed lender London Scottish Bank.
