= The Box, Plymouth =

Plymouth City Museum and Art Gallery
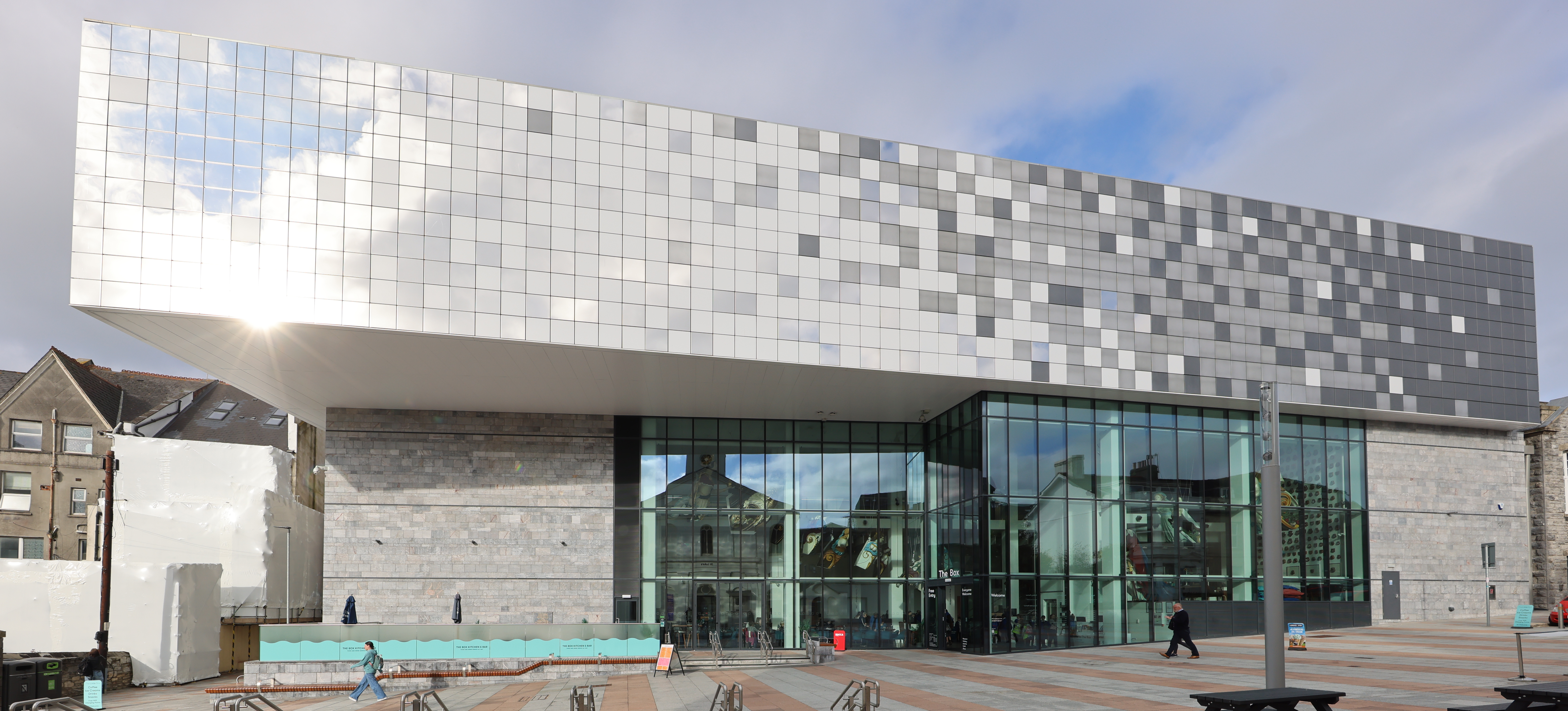
- The Box

- Location within Devon and England
- Established: 1910
- Location: Plymouth, Devon, England
- Coordinates: 50.37445°N 4.13762°W
- Type: Art museum and history museum
- Website: www.theboxplymouth.com

The Box is a museum, gallery and archive in Plymouth, Devon, England, opened in 2020 housing a collection of about 2 million items. The core of the building was previously Plymouth City Museum and Art Gallery which closed in 2016. The building was created in 1907–1910 by Thornely and Rooke in Edwardian Baroque style. and was combined with the former Central Library building and St Luke's Church on Tavistock Place into The Box.

== History ==
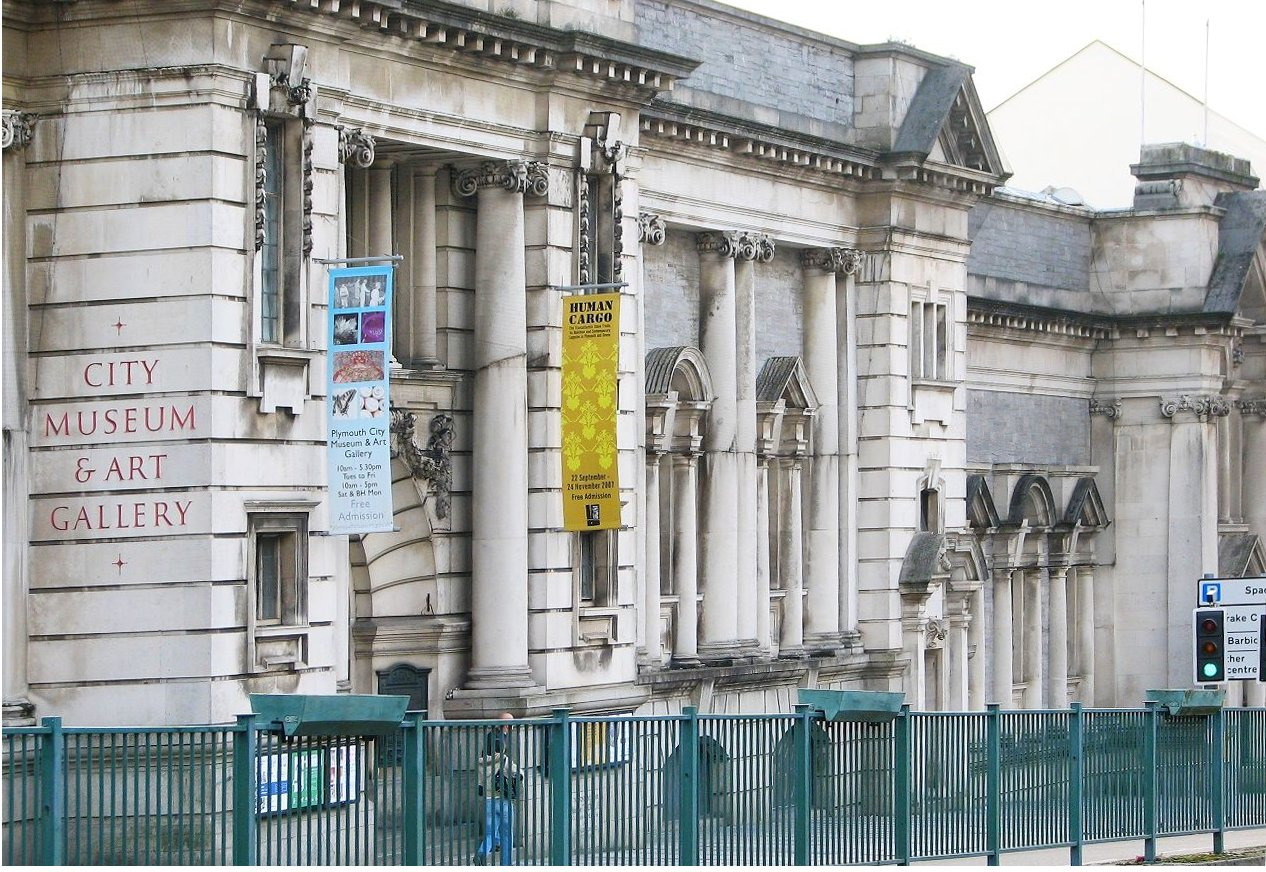
The Edwardian Baroque architecture of the museum as Plymouth Museum and Art Gallery

In early 2009, four new galleries showcasing the Museum's world cultures, Ancient Egypt, archaeology and local/maritime history collections were opened as part of a refurbishment project. The renovated ground floor galleries were formally opened by HRH Prince Philip, Duke of Edinburgh on 25 May 2009. He was Patron of the Friends of Plymouth City Museums & Gallery, which was founded in 1951, at the time.

Plymouth City Museum and Art Gallery closed its building at the start of September 2016 for major redevelopment. It re-opened in 2020 as The Box, Plymouth which encompassed the Museum and Art Gallery, former Central Library and St Luke's Church buildings with a major new extension designed by Atkins. It brought collections from the museum, Plymouth and West Devon Record Office, South West Film and Television Archive (SWFTA), South West Image Bank and the Local Studies and Reference collection from the Central Library onto one site.

In 2020, the Plymouth City Museum and Art Gallery's collections were transferred to The Box. They encompass fine and decorative arts, natural history and human history. The natural history collection consists of over 150,000 specimens and an historic natural history library and archive. Many prehistoric artefacts from Dartmoor, important Bronze Age and Iron Age material from Mount Batten and medieval and post-medieval finds from Plymouth are found in the human history collection alongside artifacts from ancient Egypt and other ancient cultures of Europe and the Middle East.

The former SWFTA archive has been merged with other film collections now held by The Box as part of their Moving Image collection. The Box holds all rights to the Westward Television and TSW archives, and is in control of any private or commercial licensing. It has been criticised for making this process needlessly bureaucratic in nature

There are permanent galleries, research facilities and a series of spaces for changing exhibitions and artistic commissions. The multi-million pound project includes major funding support from the Heritage Lottery Fund, Plymouth City Council and Arts Council England. As part of the redevelopment fourteen newly restored 19th-century figureheads were placed in the museum's atrium.

== Collections ==
The art collections include 750+ easel paintings, over 3,000 watercolours and drawings, at least 5,000 prints and a sizeable collection of sculptures. A large proportion of the art was donated to the people of Plymouth in 1852 by William Cotton (1794–1863) and is known as the Cottonian Collection. It had been put together principally by the collector Charles Rogers (1711–1784), and includes works by Sir Joshua Reynolds who was born locally.

The collections also include work by artists of the 19th-century Newlyn School, the influential 20th-century St. Ives group of painters, and the Camden Town Group. Other artists represented are Edgar Degas, Edward Burne-Jones, Paul Nash, Stanley Spencer, John William Waterhouse, Claude Lorrain, Terry Frost, J. M. W. Turner, John Brett, John Everett Millais, Ambrose Bowden Johns, Benjamin Robert Haydon, James Northcote and Samuel Prout. The latter four painters were born locally.

== Funding ==
The Museum and Art Gallery was owned and operated by Plymouth City Council. It also received operational funding from Arts Council England through its Major Partner Museums scheme.

Additional grants for specific projects, acquisitions and conservation duties came from funding bodies such as the Heritage Lottery Fund, The Art Fund, the Wolfson Foundation and the V&A Purchase Grant Fund.
