= Charles Rogers (collector) =

English art collector and connoisseur (1711-1784)

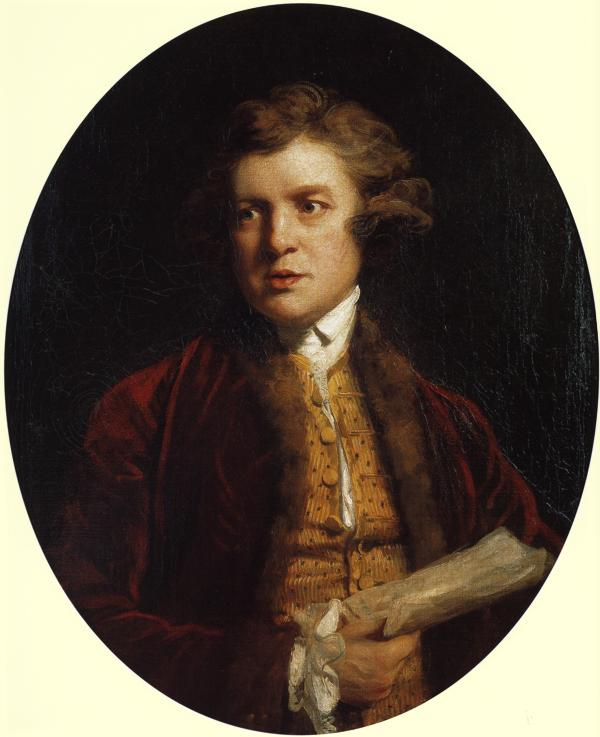
Charles Rogers, 1777 portrait

Charles Rogers FSA (2 August 1711– 2 January 1784) was an English customs official, known as an art collector. He also wrote on drawings, and became a Fellow of the Royal Society.

== Life ==
Born on 2 August 1711, he was second surviving son of William and Isabella Rogers of Dean Street, Soho, London. In May 1731 he was placed in the custom house under William Townson, from whom he acquired a taste for the fine arts and book-collecting. Townson, the head in the Customs Office of the Certificate Office, collected books and prints.

Townson left his estate to Rogers in 1740, a bequest which included a house at 3 Laurence Pountney Lane, London, containing a museum of art treasures. Here Rogers in 1746 took up residence. There were other houses left to him, one in Mark Lane, London, and the other in Richmond, Surrey. In 1747 he became clerk of the certificates.

Through his friend Arthur Pond, Rogers was elected Fellow of the Society of Antiquaries of London on 23 February 1752, and served on its council. He became Fellow of the Royal Society on 17 November 1757.

Rogers built up a print collection, with the help of friends, particular of Horatio Paul who lived abroad, and whose father Robert was a customs official, and Robert Udny. He was well connected in artistic and antiquarian circles. His personal assistant in the 1780s was Henry Walton Smith. He died unmarried on 2 January 1784, and was buried in the Laurence Pountney churchyard.

== Works ==
The major work by Rogers was a series of facsimiles of original drawings from the masters, "engraved in tint" (mezzotint or aquatint, probably with etching). The book was issued in 1778, with the title A Collection of Prints in Imitation of Drawings … to which are annexed Lives of their Authors, with Explanatory and Critical Notes, 2 vols. imperial folio. The 112 plates were engraved mainly by Francesco Bartolozzi, William Wynne Ryland, James Basire, and Simon Watts, from drawings some of which were in Rogers's own collection. Other prominent collectors that had their works reproduced in the project included Thomas Hudson.

There were Raphael drawings used, from the collection of Joshua Reynolds. From the collection of Niccolò Gabburri, there were facsimiles of drawings that Rogers had acquired, in the 1762 sale by the dealer William Kent. One living artist was included, Vieira Lusitano.

In 1782 Rogers published an anonymous blank-verse translation of Dante's Inferno. He also contributed to Archæologia and The Gentleman's Magazine.

== Legacy and the Cotton Collection ==
Rogers's collections passed at his death to William Cotton (d. 1791), who married his sister and heiress, and from him descended to his son, William Cotton, F.S.A., of the custom house. He then sold by auction in 1799 and 1801 a considerable portion of the collection; the sale occupied 24 days and realised £3,886 10s.

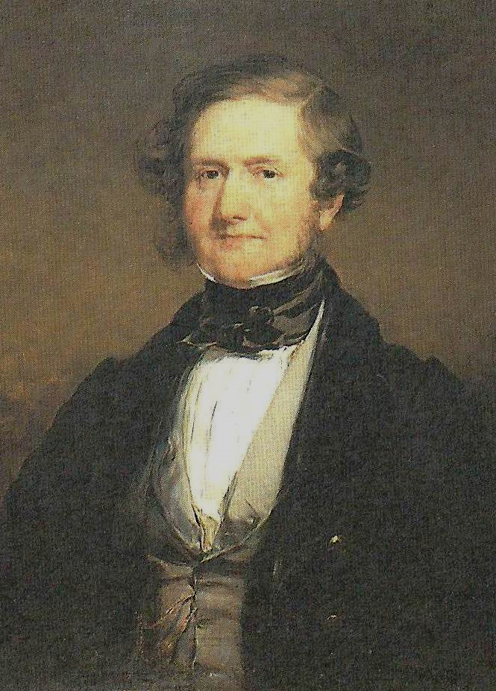
William Cotton 1794–1863, F.S.A.

The remainder, on Cotton's death in 1816, became the property of his son, William Cotton, who died in 1863. John Cotton (1802–1849), the ornithologist in Australia, was his younger brother. William Cotton matriculated at Exeter College, Oxford in 1811, aged 17, graduating B.A. in 1814, and M.A. in 1818. (He did not go into the church, as Alumni Oxonienses claims: the mistaken identity, confusion with William Cotton (died 1853) who was the son of Sir Robert Salusbury Cotton, 5th Baronet is pointed out in the Clergy of the Church of England database.) He lived at the Priory, Leatherhead, Surrey, and Highland House, Ivybridge, Devon. He published a catalogue of the Rogers collection in 1836; also on Plympton Erle and the family background of Joshua Reynolds, and Totnes; and was a Fellow of the Society of Antiquaries.

After making some additions to the collection, Cotton handed it over in two instalments, in 1852 and 1862, to the proprietors of the Plymouth Public Library. An apartment was built for it and was opened to the public on 1 June 1853 by the name of the Cottonian Library. The collection was moved in 1916 to the Plymouth City Museum and Art Gallery.

The collection included four portraits by Sir Joshua Reynolds, about five thousand prints, a few fine examples of early typography, illuminated manuscripts of the fifteenth century, carvings, models, casts, bronzes, and medals. A catalogue of the first part of the benefaction, compiled by Llewellynn Frederick William Jewitt, was printed in 1853.
