= Henry Walton Smith =

British businessman (1738–1792)

Henry Walton Smith (1738 – 23 August 1792) was an Englishman who was the founder of W. H. Smith, one of the United Kingdom's largest bookselling and newspaper vending businesses.

== Career ==
Brought up in Wrington in Somerset, Henry Walton Smith moved to London and became a personal assistant to Charles Rogers, an English customs official and art collector.

In 1792, together with his wife Anna, he founded his news vending business in London.

He died only a few months later on 23 August 1792.

== Family ==
In 1784 he married Anna Eastaugh, a servant girl (1756-c. 1816), leading to the loss of his inheritance. They went on to have two sons, Henry Edward Smith and William Henry Smith, and one daughter, Mary Anne Smith.
