= London Scottish Bank =

British bank

- Founded: 1875
- Defunct: 2010
- Type: Public limited company (PLC)
- Headquarters: London, UK
- Region served: United Kingdom
- Products: Personal loans, credit cards, savings accounts, commercial lending
- Key people: Parent: Arbuthnot Banking Group
- Employees: ~250 (2008)

London Scottish Bank PLC was a British bank based in Manchester, specialising in subprime lending.

== About ==
London Scottish Bank was a specialist financial services company that had been established for over a century. They had a nationwide network of high street branches.

The Group employed over 2,000 staff and operated in a range of markets, specialising in the provision of subprime and low income borrower loans. These services included consumer and commercial lending, secured and unsecured broking, debt collection and factoring.

In February 2008, the company announced they were stopping all lending. In November 2008 the company entered administration.

In April 2009, R Capital (led by Jamie Constable) acquired Morses Club, a doorstep lending business for people with poor credit histories, from London Scottish.

Robinson Way, the Debt Collection arm of London Scottish Bank was subject to a management buy out in August 2009.
