= Hobbycraft =

British arts and crafts retail chain

Hobbycraft Trading Limited
- Type: Private
- Industry: Retail, arts and crafts sector
- Founded: 1995; 31 years ago
- Founder: Warren Haskins
- Headquarters: Christchurch, Dorset, UK, Bournemouth, United Kingdom
- Number of locations: 124 (2024) ▲
- Area served: Physical stores in England, Wales, Scotland, Northern Ireland. Online and mobile application through Global-E (worldwide)
- Key people: Alex Willson, CEO
- Products: Art, craft and hobbyist materials
- Revenue: £203.1m (2021/22) ▲
- Owner: Modella Capital
- Number of employees: 2,428 (2024)
- Website: hobbycraft.co.uk

Hobbycraft Trading Limited is a British arts and crafts superstore retail chain.

== History ==
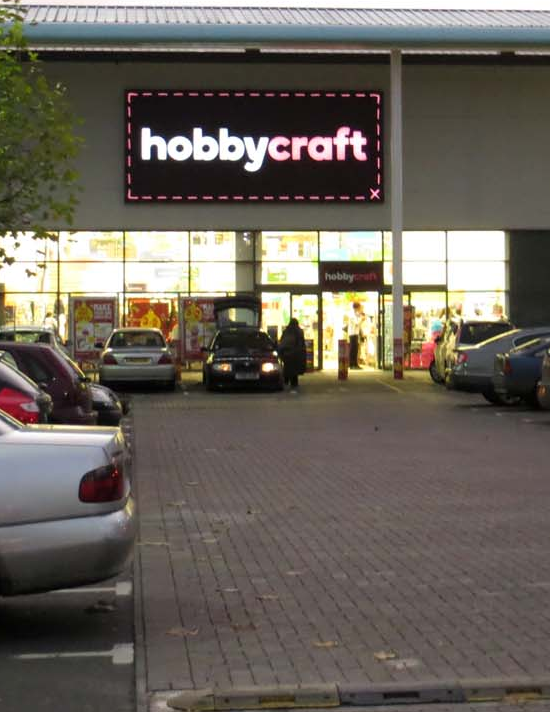
Hobbycraft in High Wycombe

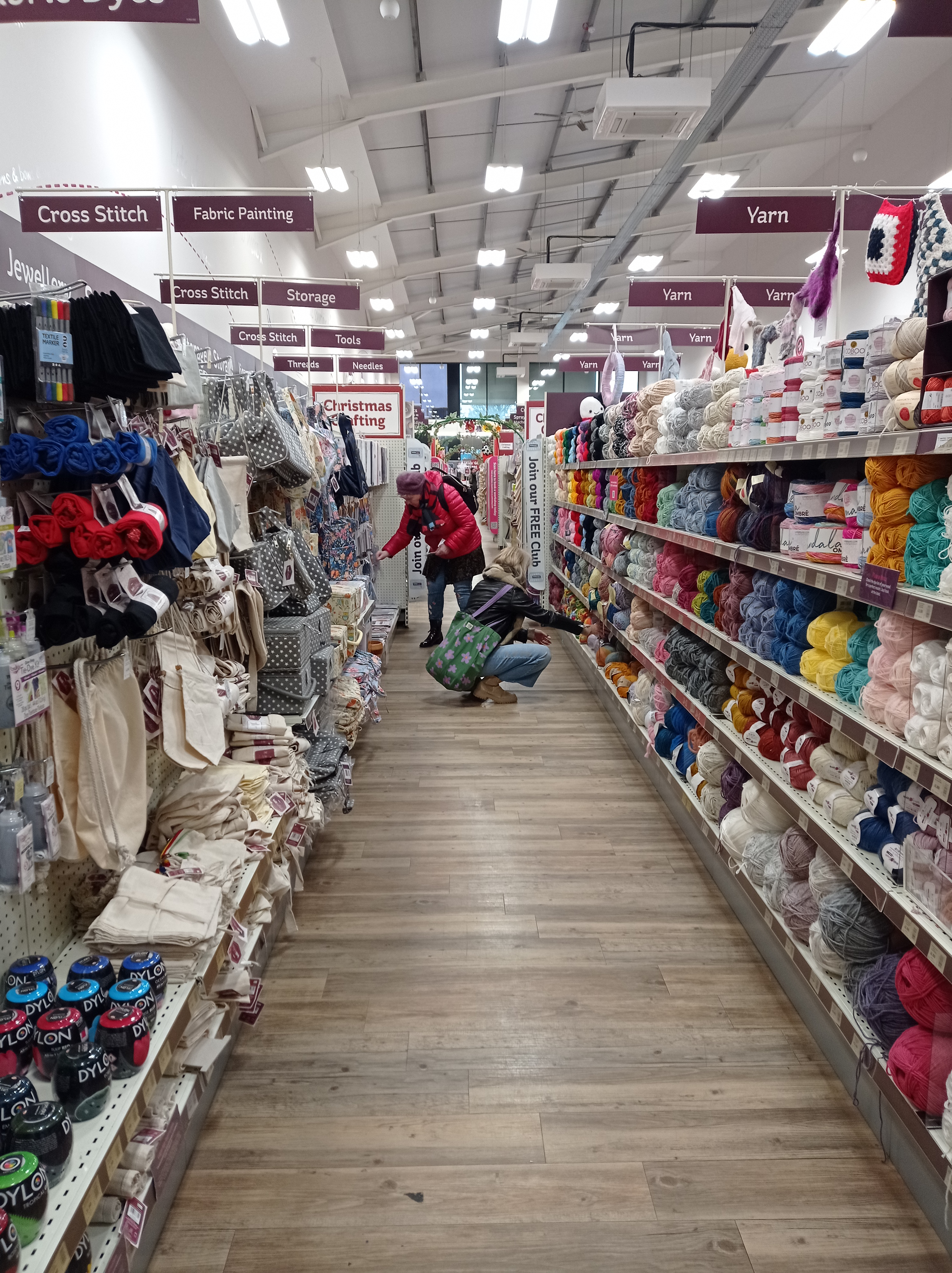
Hobbycraft, Borehamwood

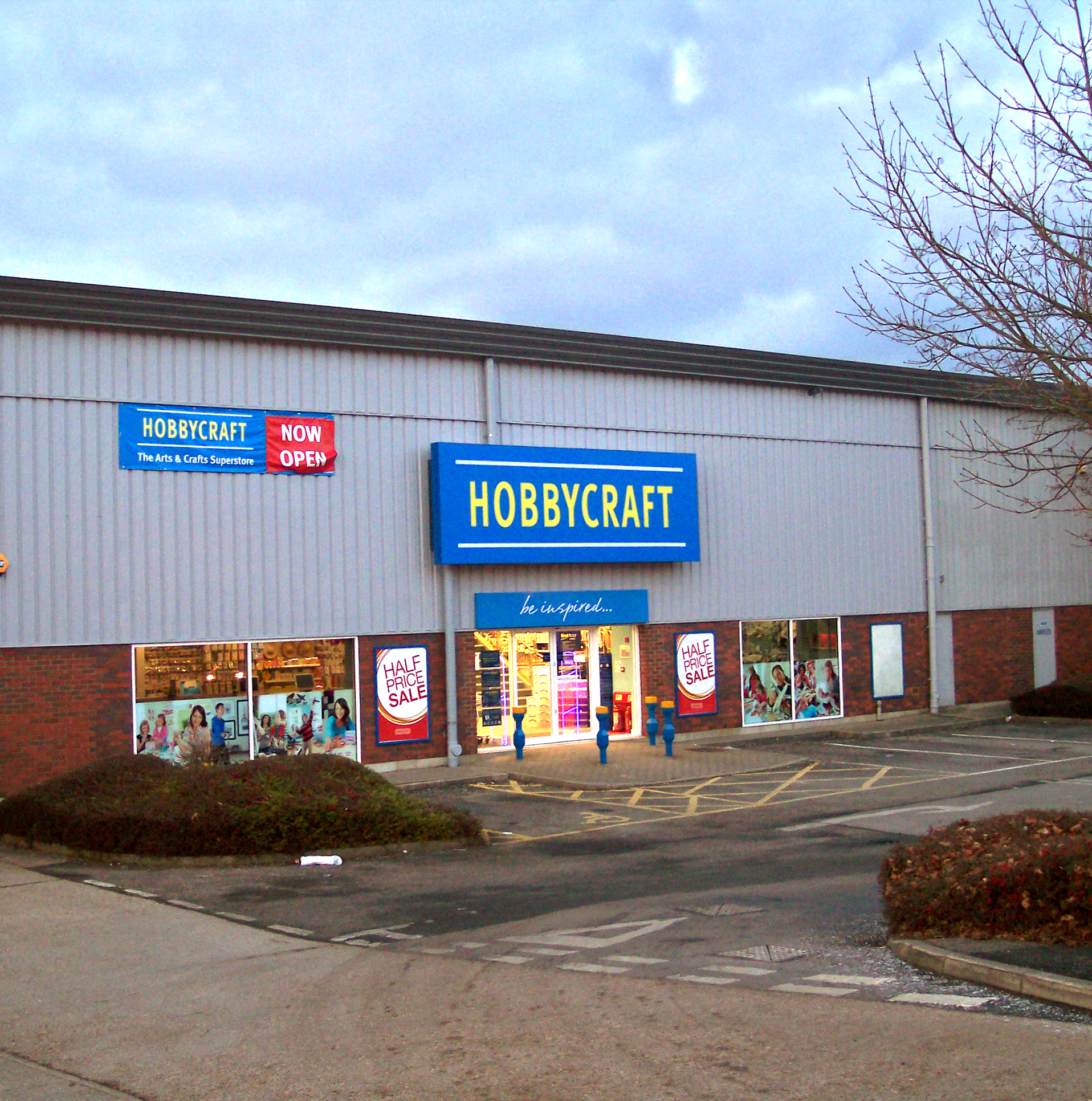
Hobbycraft in Tunbridge Wells, using the former logo

The company was founded in 1995 by the Haskins Group, a nursery and garden supplier in the south of England, and was bought by investment group Bridgepoint in April 2010, and in 2024 they sold the business to Modella Capital.

The stores have been blamed for putting independent craft suppliers out of business, and the amount of choice for specific hobbies has been said to be not as good as in specialised stores. Hobbycraft reported a 10% increase in sales in the beginning of 2010, and opened two new stores, with the chief executive saying arts and crafts are a low cost hobby and he believed they would do well despite difficulties in the economy.

In 2010 to 2011, Hobbycraft quickly brought in a new shipping system under the guidance of Hobbycraft IT Director Mike Thomas, the former supply chain director, IT and Business Development Director for Entertainment UK and Woolworths in which he had held active senior director/shareholder roles.

During the deployment of the new IT system, Hobbycraft management also decided to relocate the distribution centre operations from Blandford Forum to Burton-upon-Trent. In October 2013, it was revealed that "Hobbycraft's pre-tax profits fell from £11.5m to £6.3m last year after the company incurred exceptional costs of £2.8m, mostly as a result of the decision to relocate its distribution from Dorset to Staffordshire."

In September 2014, it was revealed that Hobbycraft's profits had halved, due to chains such as Aldi, Lidl, Poundland, and online retailers such as Amazon moving into the craft market. Hobbycraft's CEO Catriona Marshall said that the company's profits had been depressed by a £3m investment on a rented warehouse in Burton-upon-Trent, on which Hobbycraft took out a fifteen-year lease.

Marshall said: "Our performance in 2013/14 reflects investment in infrastructure and the final stages of the programme to put in place our new supply chain and online trading platform. We are now using this investment to grow store sales and our online presence."

At the start of December 2014, Bridgepoint brought in retail veteran Archie Norman in the hope of turning around the fortunes of the company.

In May 2018, Matt Davies, the new chairman, added: "This is a unique business that I have followed for many years. I look forward to working with Dominic again and to working with the team to build on its success to make Hobbycraft an even greater place for crafters and enthusiasts alike."

In August 2020, Hobbycraft announced multi-channel growth plans after a complete financial year in which its online revenues increased by 19%. The company has seen e-commerce turbocharged this year – recording a 200% rise in internet revenues as the 12-week shutdown of Covid-19 channelled much of its web revenue.

In May 2021, Hobbycraft was revealed as the Fourth Best Big Company to Work for in the UK and the third Best Retail Company to work for in the UK by the Best Companies Awards 2021.

In June 2022 Hobbycraft has posted pre-tax profit growth of £15m, representing +8.7% growth on the 2021 financial year, while revenue increased to £203.1m from £176.9m, growth of +14.8%. Hobbycraft's chief executive, Dominic Jordan, says that while the company is in a strong position heading into the 2023 financial year, the months ahead remain challenging. Dominic went on to add that the current cost of living crisis is causing problems, and that the company also faced challenges with shipping costs. To mitigate this, the retailer focused instead on its eCommerce efforts, resulting in an uplift of +58.2% in online sales. Its benefits scheme, meanwhile, now has 5.9m Hobbycraft Club members.

June 2023, saw the retailer awarded the #1 Best Big Company to work for in the UK by Best Companies Awards 2023, thanks to several compelling factors. Chris Fenlon, Retail & People Director at Hobbycraft commented; "We are delighted and so proud to have been awarded the 2023 Q2 #1 Best Big Company and #1 Retailer to work for in the UK, as we really do put our colleagues at the heart of everything we do."

In August 2023, Hobbycraft launched its first mobile app, giving customers the ability to search for product, help, and inspiration as well as manage and display their loyalty Club information.

In August 2024, investment group Bridgepoint sold the retailer to specialist retail investor Modella Capital for an undisclosed sum. Modella managing director Joseph Price said: "Hobbycraft is a business with fantastic potential, boasting a highly experienced management team, truly passionate store colleagues and real authority in a sector on the high street that continues to grow and is set to do so in the future." Modella is affiliated to the turnaround firm Rcapital and lists Ted Baker's UK licensing partner No Ordinary Designer Label, which collapsed into administration earlier this year, under its portfolio of investments.

=== 2025 store closures ===
On 22 April 2025 the company announced the planned closure, by mid-July, of nine stores across the UK as part of a restructure. Some other stores are also being "reviewed". Up to 126 workers jobs may be affected and there will be additional redundancies in the head office and distribution centre.

== Past logo ==
Logo used until June 2011

== Controversies ==
- In September 2014, Hobbycraft made wide news headlines in the United Kingdom when non-national staff were required to speak English at work or face disciplinary action.
- Another race-related controversy occurred in February 2024, when staff at a Cardiff branch of Hobbycraft refused to sell a black customer spray paint in case he intended to "undertake an incidence of graffiti".
- In May 2013, Queen's Hospital A&E department in Burton upon Trent was closed down for three hours "in accordance with national guidance" after seven workers of Hobbycraft attended A&E and reported being covered with an unknown white powder. It was later shown to be inert.
