= Modella Capital =

Private equity firm

Modella Capital Limited
- Formerly: Tailer Debtco Limited (2022–2023)
- Type: Private
- Founded: 19 August 2022; 4 years ago
- Headquarters: London, England
- Area served: Worldwide
- Parent: Hay Wain Group Limited
- Website: modellacapital.com

Modella Capital Limited is a British private equity firm, founded in August 2022. It is part of Hay Wain Group which is owned by Jamie Constable.

== History ==
In February 2025, Modella purchased The Original Factory Shop.

In June 2025, Modella purchased the WHSmith high-street business of 480 stores, and renamed the stores to TGJones.

In September 2025, Modella was named as an interested party looking to acquire the UK and Irish business of American retailer Claire's. The company eventually acquired most of it on 29 September 2025. The deal brought Modella to the Irish market for the first time.

In October 2025, Modella began a partnership with toy retailer The Entertainer. The company would supply its toys in Hobbycraft and TGJones stores starting with a trial of shops.

In December 2025, Modella Capital acquired Wynsors.

In January 2026, Next plc and Modella were shown to have an interest in Russell & Bromley. If the deal went ahead then Next would acquire the brand and website of the retailer while Modella would take over the stores and liquidate them, ending the retailer's more than 150 years of being in the high street.

Also in January 2026, both The Original Factory Shop and the UK and Irish business of Claire's went into administration, with 2,500 UK staff at risk of redundancy.

In May 2026, Modella acquired Danish retailer Flying Tiger Copenhagen from parent company Zebra A/S's owners Danske Bank and Nordea. It would significantly expand Modella's reach outside the UK and Ireland. The retailer was placed under Modella subsidiary Zebra Topco Limited.

In June 2026, Modella acquired Dealz Poland from Pepco Group. The Dealz stores in Ireland and the Isle of Man remain owned by Gordon Brothers.

== Investments ==
=== Current investments ===
- Hobbycraft (bought August 2024)
- TGJones (formerly WHSmith's high street division, bought June 2025)
- Wynsors (bought December 2025)
- Flying Tiger Copenhagen (bought May 2026)
- Dealz Poland (bought June 2026)

=== Former investments ===
- Crafter’s Companion (sold to Maven Partners)
- Ted Baker (lender, collapsed in April 2024)
- The Original Factory Shop (bought February 2025, collapsed in January 2026)
- Claire's (UK and Irish business, bought September 2025, collapsed in January 2026)
