= Flying Tiger Copenhagen =

Danish variety store chain

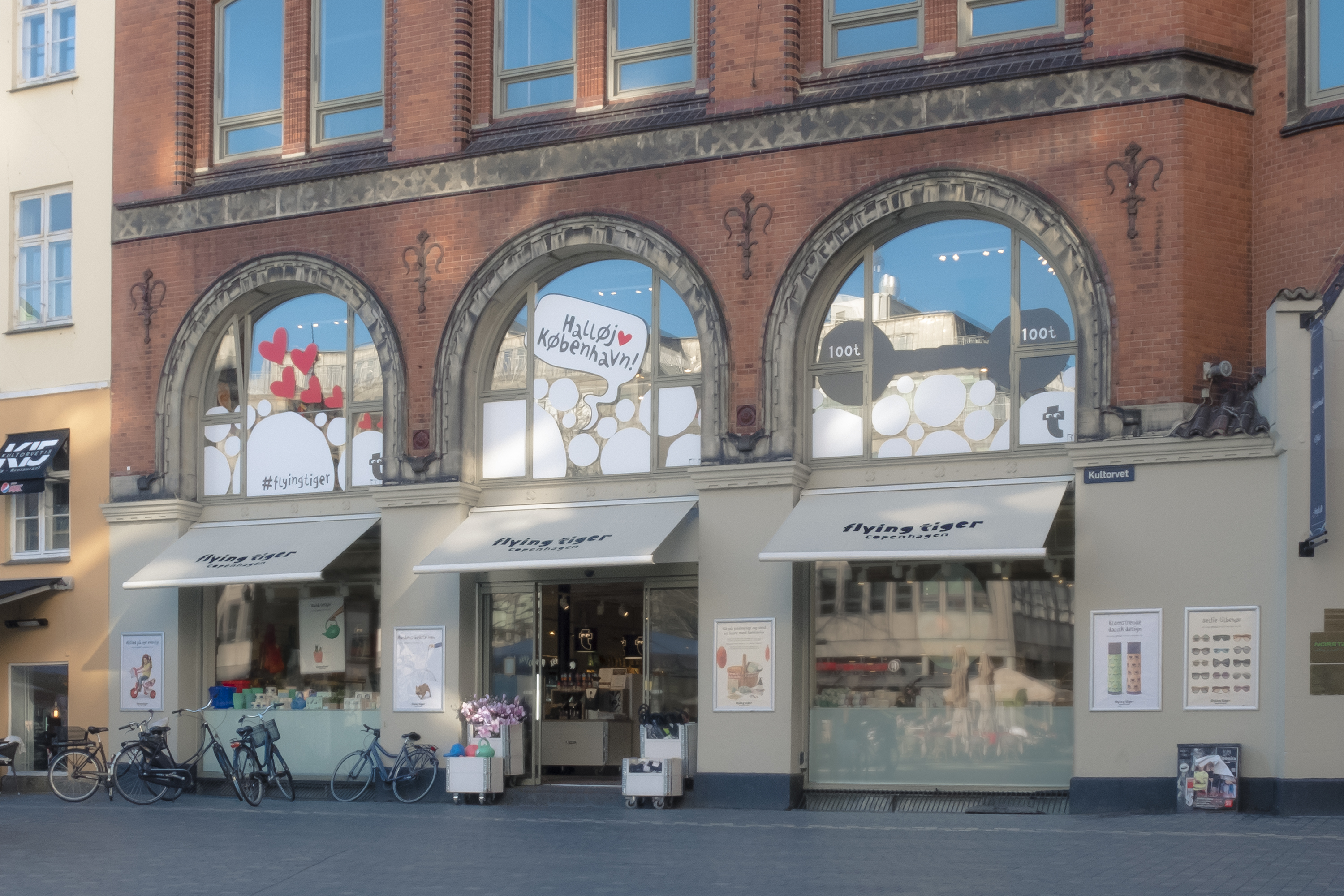
- Flying Tiger storefront on Frederiksborggade in Copenhagen.
- Type: Privately held company
- Industry: Retail
- Founded: 1995 in Copenhagen, Denmark
- Founders: Lennart Lajboschitz (founder); Suzanne Lajboschitz (co-founder)
- Headquarters: Copenhagen, Denmark
- Number of locations: 1,000+
- Area served: Worldwide
- Revenue: 5.2 billion DKK (2024)
- Owner: Modella Capital
- Parent: Zebra Topco Limited
- Website: flyingtiger.com

Flying Tiger Copenhagen (formerly Tiger until 2016) is a Danish variety store chain. Its first shop opened in Copenhagen in 1995, and the chain now (as of 2026) operates +1,100 shops across 46 countries. Flying Tiger's name derives from similarities between the Danish pronunciation of the animal name tiger (IPA: [ˈtsʰiːɐ]) and the Danish word tier (IPA: [ˈtsʰiˀɐ]), used to denote a 10 kroner coin; in the first stores in Denmark, all items cost 10 kroner.

The chain sells a variety of items, mostly accessories and toys. The layout of its stores resemble mazes. Flying Tiger's former CEO, Mette Maix, said the format of the shop is designed to feel "like a treasure hunt" by adding at least 300 new items each month to the shop's selection.

== History ==
Logo in some countries until June 2016

In 1988, Lennart Lajboschitz and his wife Suzanne opened their first store, Zebra, in Copenhagen. The store sold surplus goods, umbrellas, and other accessories. In 1995, Lajboschitz opened the first Tiger storefront in Islands Brygge, Copenhagen.

In 2012, EQT Partners acquired a 70% stake in the company by investing in Flying Tiger's parent company Zebra A/S. In 2014, Tiger Stores Ireland won Company of the Year and Best Small Company at the Retail Excellence Ireland awards.

In January 2015, the company appointed former The Body Shop director Xavier Vidal as its new chief executive officer. In 2016, the company officially changed its name worldwide to Flying Tiger Copenhagen; it has previously used other names due to the name "Tiger" not being allowed in all markets.

In 2021, the company was sold by its founder, Lajboschitz, and EQT Partners to Treville, a Danish investment firm. That year, Flying Tiger also began selling their products online.

Before June 2016, the brand operated as Tiger (or Tiger Copenhagen) in most markets, and as TGR in Sweden and Norway.

In May 2026, British private equity firm Modella Capital acquired the retailer from Zebra A/S owners Danske Bank and Nordea. It would significantly expand Modella's reach outside the UK and Ireland. The retailer was placed under Modella subsidiary Zebra Topco Limited.

== Markets ==
Flying Tiger Copenhagen stores can be found worldwide, with a European core network owned and operated at Group level. Most markets outside Europe are franchise partnerships. The chain is present in 45 markets globally: Austria, Belgium, Czechia, Denmark, Estonia, Finland, France, Germany, Greece, Hungary, Iceland, Ireland, Israel, Italy, Latvia, Lithuania, Netherlands, Norway, Poland, Portugal, Slovakia, Spain, Sweden, Switzerland, Turkey, United Kingdom, Japan, Indonesia, Malaysia, Philippines, Singapore, Thailand, Vietnam, Australia, Canada, Saudi Arabia, and United Arab Emirates.

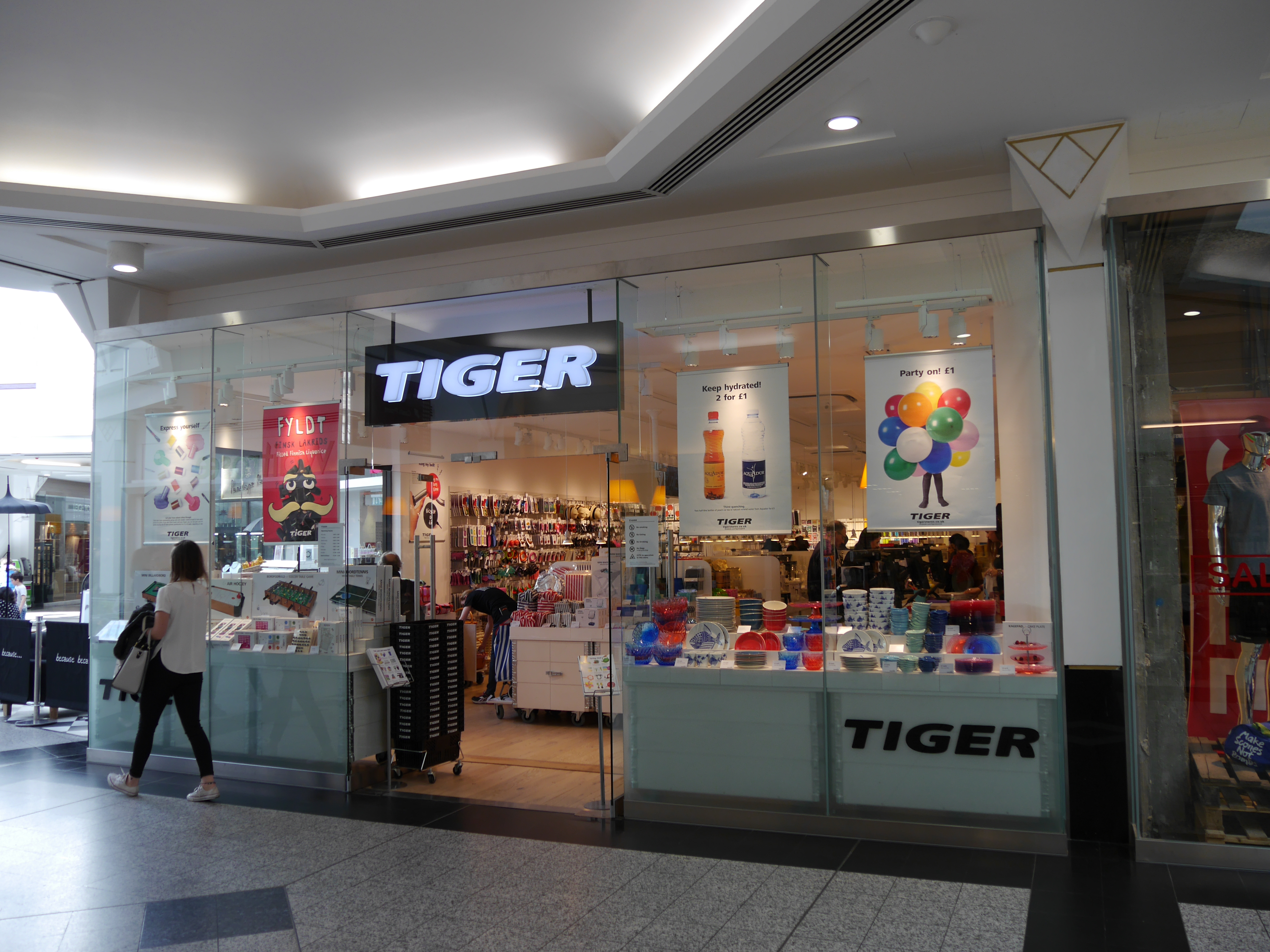
Tiger shop (old branding) in Putney, London, England

After its initial opening and operation across the Kingdom of Denmark, Tiger expanded abroad to Iceland in 2001. In 2005, the company opened its first shop in Britain, in Basingstoke, later followed by other parts in the United Kingdom. They no longer operate in Northern Ireland as of 2021 due to poor sales. In 2008, Tiger also opened up its first stores in Spain (Madrid), the Netherlands (Arnhem) and Sweden (Malmö). In 2011, the company opened its first shop in Italy, in Turin, with Italy now the chain's largest market globally. It also opened in a number of other countries thereafter.

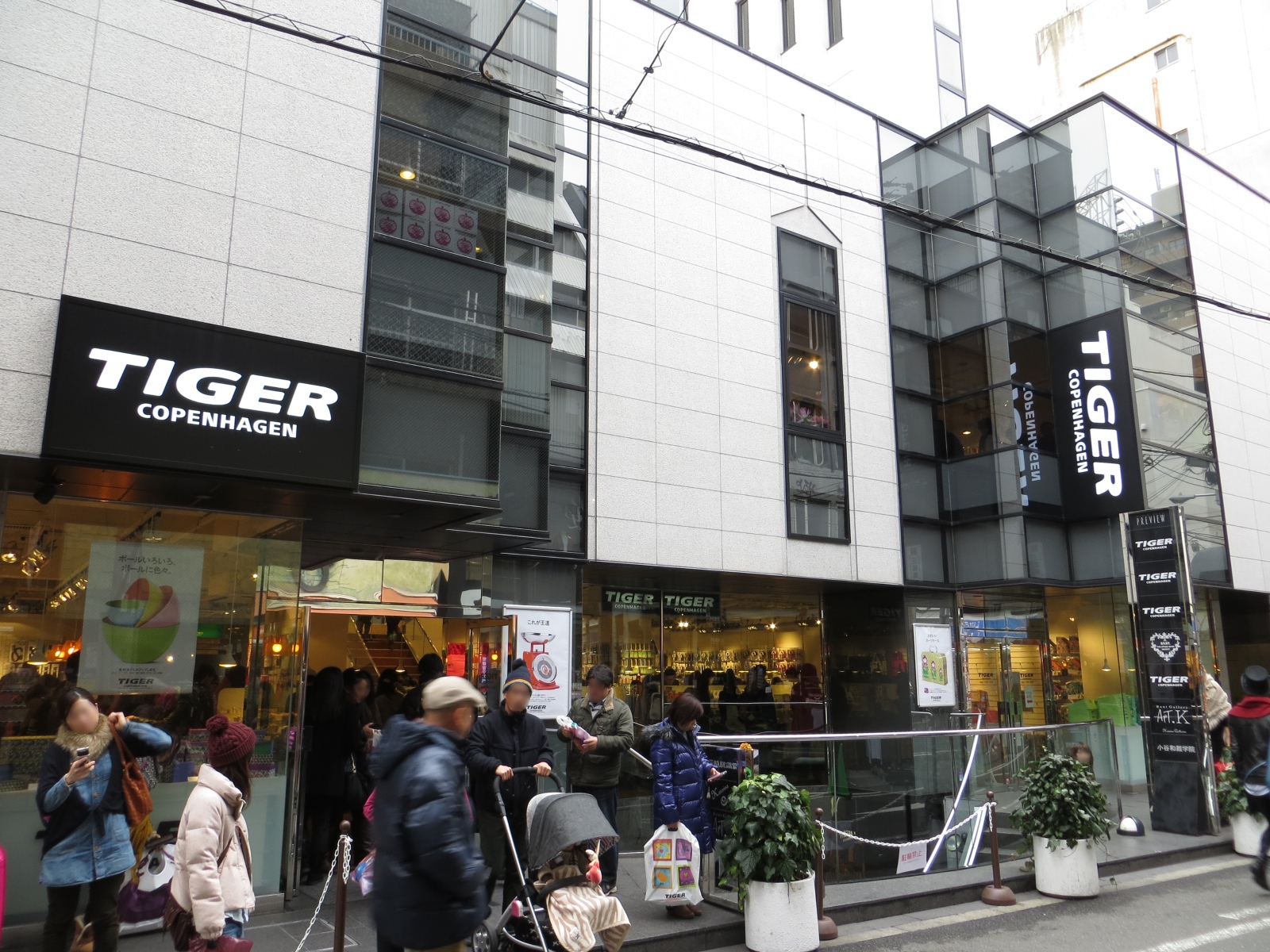
Tiger shop (old branding) at Amerikamura in Chūō-ku, Osaka, Japan.

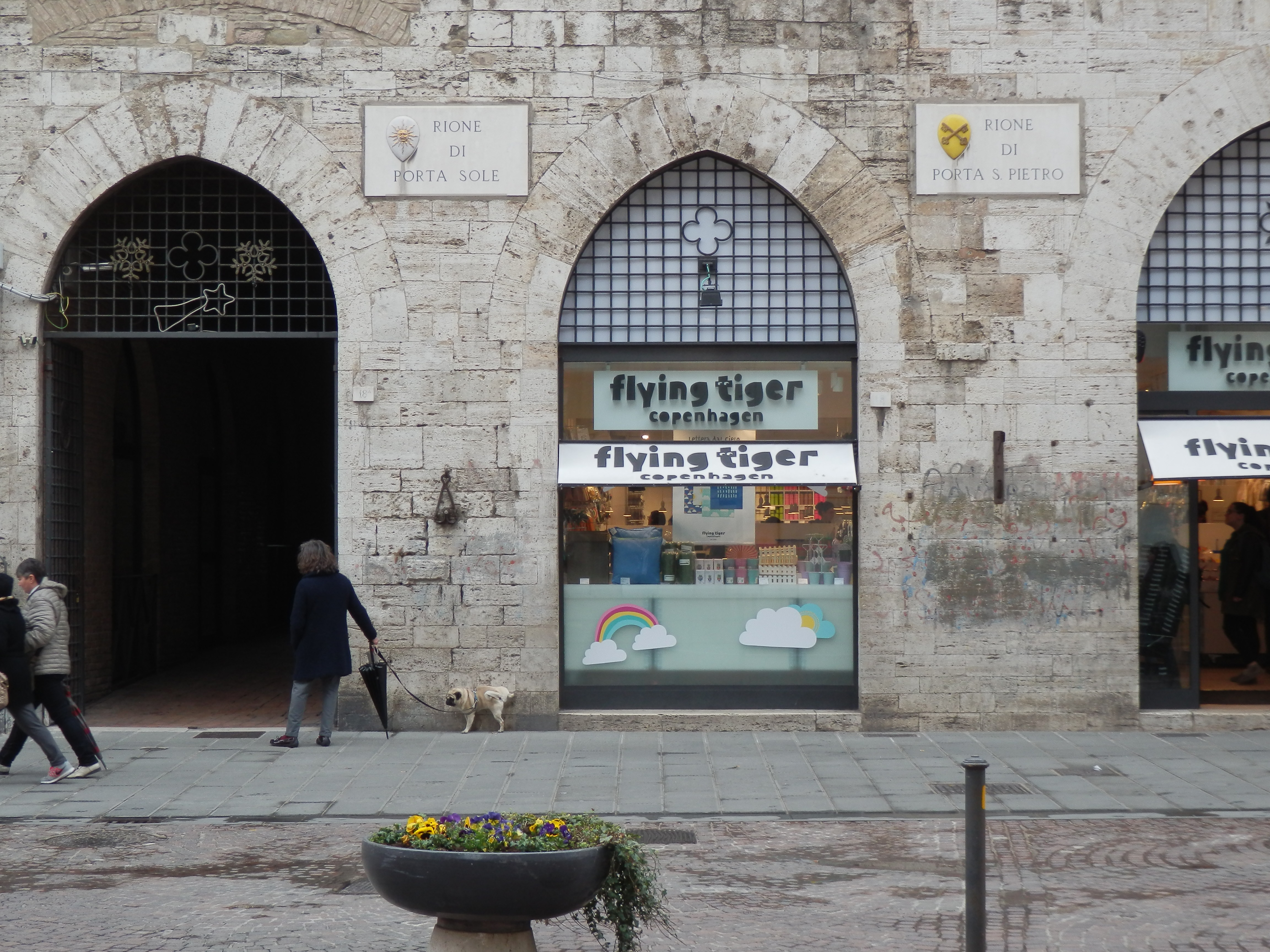
Flying Tiger shop (new branding) in Perugia, Italy

2012 marked the chain's expansion to markets outside of Europe with the opening of a Tiger store in Japan. The company opened its first store in the United States in New York City in May 2015, a 5,000-square-foot/152 mq store in Manhattan's Flatiron District. In November 2018, the company announced the opening of four shops in Massachusetts and planned to open 20 more locations in New England in the next few years. However, in November 2020, Flying Tiger closed all of its stores in the United States. The chain did not initially open across the border in Canada, but as of June 2026, opened a store in Toronto with 4 more in the works.

In 2022, Flying Tiger Copenhagen opened its first store in the United Arab Emirates at the Dubai Hills Mall and also its first in Saudi Arabia the same year. The chain expanded in Asia-Pacific markets from 2023, with openings in Indonesia and the Philippines, followed by Australia, Vietnam, Malaysia and Singapore. In 2024, Flying Tiger opened its first store in Turkey, in the Kanyon Shopping Mall of Istanbul, and since then rapidly expanded in the country. In June 2026, Flying Tiger Copenhagen entered the Americas with the opening of its first store in Canada, followed by launches in El Salvador and Guatemala, marking the beginning of an ambitious expansion plan across Latin America.
