= Wynsors World of Shoes =

British shoe retailer

Courtesy Shoes Ltd
- Type: Private Limited
- Industry: Shoe Store
- Founded: 1956; 70 years ago
- Headquarters: Rossendale, England
- Number of locations: 45 stores
- Area served: United Kingdom
- Products: Shoes
- Website: wynsors.com

Wynsors (formerly known as Wynsors World of Shoes) is the trading name of Courtesy Shoes Limited, comprising a chain of over 45 shoe stores in England.

== Growth of Wynsors ==
When established in May 1956 Courtesy Shoes began life as a small number of Market Hall stalls and Shops. In the sixties, Courtesy Shoes purchased two chains of high street shoe shops called Seftons and Lees of Leeds which were re-branded as Medina Shoes. Both chains were consisting of around 12 shops, Seftons based around the Bradford area and Lees in the towns surrounding Leeds city centre. With success on the high street and the desire to expand quickly, Courtesy began to open concession stores within Kwik Save supermarkets at the height of Kwik Save's success in the seventies, again trading as Medina Shoes.

Toward the end of the 1970s and early 1980s, there was a change in trends towards out-of-town shopping and Courtesy began to move away from the high street. The first out of town shop opened was in Cleckheaton called The Factory Shoe Shop. The success of Cleckheaton gave the company a lot of confidence and shortly after in 1984 they opened their second out-of-town store in Thurcroft. The previous owners of the building were Wynsor House Discount Carpets which was changed to Wynsor House Discount Footwear before eventually becoming the first Wynsors World of Shoes.

As Wynsors entered the early 1990s, they expanded into the branded sports footwear market. This helped with the steady growth in the number of stores throughout the 1990s and 2000s and helped Wynsors establish itself as one of the largest specialist footwear retailers in UK.
