= List of retailers in New Zealand =

This is a list of notable past and present bricks and mortar retailers in New Zealand. Those marked in grey no longer operate.

Name	Retail format	Main products	Number of stores	Number of Auckland stores	Parent company	Founded	Head office
2degrees	Electronics store	Mobile phones	55	20	2degrees	2007 in Auckland	Wynyard Quarter, Auckland
3 Guys (closed 2003)	Supermarket	Groceries	6 (2003)	4 (2003)	Progressive Enterprises	1973 in Māngere, Auckland	Favona, Auckland
Allied Petroleum	Petrol station	Petrol, diesel	140	2	HWR Group	1993 in Wigram, Christchurch	Wigram, Christchurch
Arthur Barnett (rebranded as H & J Smith in 2015)	Department store	Clothing, general merchandise	5 (1992)	0 (1992)	Arthur Barnett	1903 in George Street, Dunedin	Dunedin
The Athlete's Foot New Zealand	Shoe store	Shoes	12	6	Accent Group	1918 in Sydney	Melbourne, Australia
Bakers Delight	Bakery	Baked goods	19	13	Bakers Delight Holdings	1995 in Pakuranga, Auckland	Melbourne, Australia
Ballantynes	Department store	Clothing, general merchandise	3	0	Ballantynes	1854 in Christchurch CBD	Christchurch CBD
Barkers	Clothing store	Clothing (men's)	31	13	Barkers	1972 in Auckland CBD	Grafton, Auckland
Bendon Lingerie	Clothing store	Underwear, swimwear, sleepwear	31	11	Bendon Group	2003 in Newmarket, Auckland	Airport Oaks, Auckland
Big Barrel	Liquor store	Liquor	48	1	Big Barrel	2003 in Marewa, Napier	Tamatea, Napier
Big Fresh (rebranded as Countdown in 2004)	Supermarket	Groceries	10 (2003)	2 (2003)	Progressive Enterprises'	1988 in Mount Wellington	Favona, Auckland
Birds Liquorsave (taken over by The Mill in 2005)	Liquor store	Liquor	5 (2005)	0 (2005)	Birds Liquorsave	1991 in Hamilton Central	Hamilton Central
Black Bull Liquor	Liquor store	Liquor	66	19	Thirsty Liquor	2011 in Huapai, Auckland	Ellerslie, Auckland
The Body Shop (closed in 2025)	Cosmetics store	Cosmetics	16 (2025)		Natura & Co	1989	Littlehampton, England
Bond & Bond (closed in 2013)	Electronics store	Appliances	24 (2013)	10 (2013)	The Warehouse Group	1875 in Silverdale, Auckland	Northcote, Auckland
Borders (closed in 2011)	Bookstore	Books, compact discs, stationery, café	5 (2007)	2 (2007)	Borders (2000–2008), REDgroup Retail (2008–2011)	2000 in Auckland CBD	Melbourne, Australia
The Bottle-O	Liquor store	Liquor	104	33	Metcash	Unknown	Wiri, Auckland
BP	Petrol station	Petrol, coffee, pies, groceries	240	64	BP	1946	Newmarket, Auckland
BP/Woolworths (rebranded as BP Express in 2000)	Supermarket	Groceries	2 (2000)	2 (2000)	Progressive Enterprises	1999	Favona, Auckland
Briscoes	Homeware store	Homeware, appliances, linen	47	13	Briscoe Group	1862 in Dunedin	Morningside, Auckland
Building Depot (closed in 2004)	Hardware store	Building supplies, household hardware	10 (2002)	3 (2004)	Fletcher Building (1970–2003), Wesfarmers (2003–2004)	1970	Auckland
Bunnings	Hardware store	Hardware, building supplies, garden products, outdoor furniture	41	12	Wesfarmers	2001	Ellerslie, Auckland
Burger King	Fast food outlet	Burgers	65	25	Tahua Group	1993	Takapuna, Auckland
BurgerFuel	Fast food outlet	Burgers	78	25	Burger Fuel Group	1995 in Ponsonby, Auckland	Ponsonby, Auckland
Caltex New Zealand	Petrol station	Petrol, diesel, groceries	138	39	Z Energy	1936	Wellington CBD
Carl's Jr. New Zealand	Fast food outlet	Fast food, burgers, snacks, soft drinks	15	8	Restaurant Brands	2011 in Takānini, Auckland	Penrose, Auckland
Carters	Building supply store	Building supplies	49	12	Carters	1859 in Napier Central	East Tāmaki, Auckland
Challenge	Petrol station	Petrol, diesel	78	5	Challenge	1998	Christchurch CBD
Chemist Warehouse	Pharmacy	Medications, vitamins, cosmetics	30	17	Chemist Warehouse	2017 in Glenfield, Auckland	Glen Innes, Auckland
The Coffee Club	Cafe	Coffee, breakfast, lunch, snacks	62	39		2005 in Queensgate Shopping Centre, Lower Hutt	Grafton, Auckland
ColourPlus	Paint store	Paint, wallpaper, curtains, blinds	9	1	CPHC Limited	1999	Hastings Central
Connor	Clothing store	Clothing (men's)	5	4	Retail Apparel Group	Unknown	Sydney
Cotton Body	Clothing store	Sportswear, lingerie	23	7	Cotton On Group	Unknown	Geelong, Australia
Cotton On	Clothing store	Clothing, children's clothing	28	6	Cotton On Group	2006 in Queensgate Shopping Centre, Lower Hutt	Geelong, Australia
Cotton On Kids	Clothing store	Children's clothing	2	5	Cotton On Group	Unknown	Geelong, Australia
Countdown (rebranded to Woolworths in 2023)	Supermarket	Groceries, liquor	184	61	Woolworths (New Zealand)	1981	Favona, Auckland
Countdown Metro (rebranded to Woolworths Metro in 2024)	Supermarket	Groceries, takeaway food	4	2	Woolworths (New Zealand)	2019 at Commercial Bay, Auckland CBD	Favona, Auckland
Country Road	Clothing store	Clothing, children's clothing	11	6	Country Road Group	Unknown	Melbourne, Australia
David Jones	Department stores	Clothing, shoes, handbags, cosmetics, homeware, appliances	1	1	David Jones	2016 in Wellington CBD	Melbourne, Australia
DEKA (closed or rebranded as Farmers in 2001)	Department store	Clothing, underwear, shoes, toys, cosmetics, furniture	61 (2000)	11 (2000)	Farmers DEKA	1988 (through rebranding of Woolworths and McKenzies)	Flat Bush, Auckland
D.I.C. (closed 1992)	Department store	Clothing, general merchandise	16 (1988)	0 (1988)	Arthur Barnett	1884 in Princes Street, Dunedin	Dunedin
Dick Smith Electronics	Electronics store	Appliances, consumer electronics	62 (2016)	20 (2016)	Woolworths Group (1980–2012), Anchorage Capital (2012–2013), Dick Smith Holdings (2013–2016)	Unknown	Sydney
Domino's Pizza	Fast food outlet	Pizza	95	14	Domino's Pizza	2003	Mount Eden, Auckland
Donut King	Fast food outlet	Donuts	5	0	Donut King	1981	Southport, Queensland
Dotti	Clothing store	Clothing (women's), shoes	18	6	Just Group	2004	Melbourne, Australia
Dr. Martens	Shoe store	Shoes, clothes	3	2	Accent Group	Unknown	Melbourne, Australia
Duffy & Finn's (phased out in 2011)	Liquor store	Liquor	2 (2011)	1 (2011)	Foodstuffs	2006 in Porirua Central	Māngere, Auckland
Dunkin' Donuts	Fast food outlet	Donuts, coffee	18	15	Dunkin' Donuts	2001 in Manukau, Auckland	Penrose, Auckland
EB Games New Zealand (Closed In 2026)	Video games store	Video games, collectibles, board games	41	12	GameStop	2000	Eagle Farm, Australia
EziBuy	Department store	Clothing, homeware, appliances	6	2	EziBuy	1978 in Palmerston North Central	Auckland CBD
Farmers	Department store	Clothing, cosmetics, underwear, toys, homeware, Appliances, furniture	58	17	James Pascoe Group	1909	Flat Bush, Auckland
Foodtown	Supermarket	Groceries, liquor	33 (2008)	29 (2008)	Progressive Enterprises	1958 in Ōtāhuhu, Auckland	Favona, Auckland
Foot Locker	Shoe store	Shoes	13	6	Foot Locker	2002	Auckland CBD
Four Square	Supermarket	Groceries	231	21	Foodstuffs	1925	Māngere, Auckland
Freedom Furniture	Furniture store	Furniture, bedding, kitchenware, homeware	14	5	Greenlit Brands	1996	Sydney
FreshChoice	Supermarket	Groceries, liquor	33	5	Woolworths (New Zealand)	1995	Favona, Auckland
GAS Petrol Service Stations	Petrol station	Petrol, diesel	127	33	GAS Petrol Service Stations	1999	Kingsland, Auckland
Glassons	Clothing store	Clothing (women's), swimwear	34	12	Hallensteins Glassons	1918 in Cashel Street, Christchurch	Newmarket, Auckland
Glengarry	Liquor store	Wine, spirits	16	14	Glengarry	1940 in Oratia, Auckland	Victoria Park, Auckland
Goldmark Jeweller	Jewellery store	Jewellery, watches	12	4	James Pascoe Group	2007	Auckland CBD
Gull New Zealand	Petrol station	Petrol, diesel	113	45	Gull New Zealand	1999 in Frankton, Hamilton	Takapuna, Auckland
Guthrie Bowron	Paint store	Paint, wallpaper, flooring, curtains, blinds	51	5	Guthrie Bowron	1932 in Christchurch CBD	Parnell, Auckland
H & J Smith	Department store	Clothing, cosmetics, homeware	3	0	H & J Smith	1900 in Invercargill Central	Invercargill Central
H&M	Clothing store	Clothing (women's), men's clothing, children's clothing	9	4	Hennes & Mauritz	2016 in Sylvia Park, Mount Wellington, Auckland	Auckland CBD
Hallenstein Brothers	Clothing store	Clothing (men's)	41	13	Hallensteins Glassons	1876 in The Octagon, Dunedin	Newmarket, Auckland
Hammer Hardware	Hardware store	Household hardware, garden centre, building supplies, power tools, paint, barbecues	44	9	Hammer Hardware Ltd	1994	Devonport, Auckland
Hannahs	Shoe store	Shoes	54	13	Hannahs	1868 in Charleston, New Zealand	Newmarket, Auckland
Hardwarehouse (rebranded as Bunnings in 2003)	Hardware store	Household hardware, building supplies	3 (2000)	3 (2000)	BBC Hardware (1995–2001), Wesfarmers (2001–2003)	1995 in Pakuranga, Auckland	Sydney
Harvey Norman	Department store	Appliances, furniture, bedding, computers	44	13	Harvey Norman	1997 in Wairau Valley, Auckland	Manukau, Auckland
Health 2000	Health store	Dietary supplements	51	5	Health 2000	1993	Rukuhia, Waikato
Hell Pizza	Fast food outlet	Pizza	79	28	Hell Pizza	1996 in Kelburn, Wellington	Mount Cook, Wellington
Henry's	Liquor store	Liquor	16	0	Foodstuffs	2006 in Queenstown	Northcote, Christchurch
Hill and Stewart (closed in 2010)	Electronics store	Appliances	6 (2009)	6 (2009)	Hill and Stewart (1951–2006), JB Hi-fi (2006–2010)	1951 in Auckland CBD	Melbourne, Australia
Huffer	Clothing store	Clothing	13	4	Huffer	2011 in Newmarket, Auckland	Ponsonby, Auckland
Hype DC	Shoe store	Shoes	13	7	Accent Group	Unknown	Melbourne, Australia
Icebreaker	Clothing store	Clothing	13	6	VF Corporation	2005 in Wellington Airport	Ponsonby, Auckland
ITM	Building supply store	Building supplies, power tools, kitchens, paint	95	16	Independent Timber Merchants Society	1991 in Whangārei	Rosedale, Auckland
Jacqui E	Clothing store	Clothing (women's)	19	6	Just Group	Unknown	Melbourne, Australia
Jay Jays	Clothing store	Clothing, fashion accessories	28	8	Just Group	Unknown	Melbourne, Australia
JB Hi-Fi	Electronics store	Computers, TVs, audio equipment, video games, DVDs, cameras	14	7	JB Hi-Fi	2007 in Auckland CBD	Wairau Valley, Auckland
JD Sports	Sporting goods store	Shoes, sportswear	1	1	JD Sports	2021 at Sylvia Park, Auckland	Sydney
Jesters Pies	Fast food outlet	Pies	12	5	Jesters Pies	2002 in LynnMall, Auckland	Mairangi Bay, Auckland
Johnny Bigg	Clothing store	Plus-size menswear	9	4	Retail Apparel Group	2017 in Manukau, Auckland	Sydney
Just Jeans	Clothing store	Clothing, children's clothing	45	14	Just Group	Unknown	Melbourne, Australia
Kathmandu	Outdoors store	Clothing, packs, camping gear	48	14	Kathmandu Holdings Limited	1987 in Christchurch CBD	Christchurch CBD
KFC New Zealand	Fast food outlet	Fried chicken, burgers	102	35	Restaurant Brands	1971 in Royal Oak, Auckland	Penrose, Auckland
Kings Plant Barn	Garden centre	Plants, garden equipment	8	8	Kings Plant Barn	1992 in Takapuna, Auckland	Forrest Hill
Kirkcaldie & Stains (closed 2016)	Department store	Clothing, cosmetics, general merchandise	1 (2016)	0 (2016)	David Jones	1863 in Wellington CBD	Wellington CBD
Kmart	Department store	Homeware, furniture, linen, toys, clothing, outdoor equipment	21	6	Wesfarmers	1988 in Henderson, Auckland	Perth, Australia
Krispy Kreme	Fast food outlet	Donuts	5	5	Krispy Kreme, Inc.	2018 in Manukau, Auckland	Manukau, Auckland
Lincraft	Homeware store	Fabric, craft supplies, art supplies, bedding, linen	6	0	Lincraft	2005	Dunedin
Life Pharmacy	Pharmacy	Medications, cosmetics, skincare, natural health, gifts	65	23	Green Cross Health	1995	Ellerslie, Auckland
Lightingplus	Electronics store	Lighting	33	9	Lightingplus	1982 in Ponsonby, Auckland	East Tāmaki, Auckland
Liquor Centre	Liquor store	Liquor	175	71	Metcash (2020–)	1992	Wiri, Auckland
Liquor King (closed in 2022)	Liquor store	Liquor	19	2	Lion (1995–2021), Liquor King (2021–2022)	1995	Freemans Bay, Auckland
Liquor Spot	Liquor store	Liquor	41 (+24 affiliates)	29	Metcash (2020–)	1992	Wiri, Auckland
LiquorLand	Liquor store	Liquor	147	45	Foodstuffs	1981	Māngere, Auckland
Living & Giving	Homeware store	Homeware, kitchenware, gifts	15	7	Briscoe Group	1987 in Mount Eden	Sandringham, Auckland
Macpac	Outdoors store	Clothing, packs, camping gear	33	9	Super Retail Group	2008 in Christchurch Central	Hillsborough, Christchurch
Maher Shoes	Shoe store	Shoes	6	1	Maher Shoes	2008 in Christchurch CBD	Christchurch CBD
Max Fashion	Clothing store	Women's clothing	32	10	Barkers	1980s	Grafton, Auckland
McDonald's	Fast food outlet	Burgers	170	58	McDonald's	1976 in Porirua Central	Greenlane, Auckland
Merchant 1948	Shoe store	Shoes	33	11	Overland Footwear Group	1948 in King Country	Newmarket, Auckland
Merchants Liquor	Liquor store	Liquor	10	3	Metcash	Unknown	Wiri, Auckland
Mi Piaci	Shoe store	Shoes, handbags	30	11	Overland Footwear Group	Unknown	Newmarket, Auckland
Michael Hill Jeweller	Jewellery store	Jewellery, watches	55	17	Michael Hill International	1979 in Whangārei	Brisbane, Australia
The Mill (taken over by LiquorLand in 2015)	Liquor store	Liquor	35 (2015)	0 (2015)	The Mill Holdings	1993 in New Plymouth Central	New Plymouth
Mitre 10	Hardware store	Hardware, building supplies, garden products	84	19	Mitre 10 New Zealand	1974	Albany, Auckland
Mobil New Zealand	Petrol station	Petrol, diesel	167	68	ExxonMobil	1896 in Wellington Central	Grafton, Auckland
Mountain Designs (closed in 2014)	Outdoors store	Clothing, tramping boots, packs, camping gear	12 (2014)	3 (2013)	Mountain Designs Holdings	2001	Brisbane, Australia
New World	Supermarket	Groceries, liquor	142	26	Foodstuffs	1963	Māngere, Auckland
New World Fresh Collective (closed in 2023)	Supermarket	Groceries	10	1	Foodstuffs	2017 in Mairangi Bay, Auckland	Māngere, Auckland
New World Metro	Supermarket	Groceries, liquor	4	2	Foodstuffs	2002 in Wellington CBD	Māngere, Auckland
Nick Scali Furniture	Furniture store	Furniture	5	3	Nick Scali Limited	2017 in Mount Wellington, Auckland	Sydney
NPD	Fuel distribution		96 (2021)				Nelson
Night 'n Day	Supermarket	Groceries, hot food, coffee, ice cream	51	5	Night 'n Day	1984 in Dunedin North	Dunedin
Nike	Clothing store	Shoes, sportswear	7	5	Nike, Inc.	Unknown	Freemans Bay, Auckland
Noel Leeming	Electronics store	Computers, appliances, TVs, audio equipment	71	20	The Warehouse Group	1973 in Barrington, Christchurch	Northcote, Auckland
Nood Furniture	Furniture store	Furniture, homewares, gifts	15	5	Nood Furniture	2007 in Woolston, Christchurch	Woolston, Christchurch
NOVO Shoes	Shoe store	Shoes	13	9	NOVO Shoes	Unknown	Glenfield, Auckland
Number One Shoes	Shoe store	Shoes	36	14	Hannahs	Unknown	Newmarket, Auckland
NZ Safety Blackwoods	Hardware store	Personal protective equipment, workwear, packaging, power tools	32	8	Wesfarmers	2003 (through rebranding of Pakyel)	Wiri, Auckland
Office Spot	Stationery store	Stationery	1	0	Paper Plus Group in 2012	2007 in Ashburton	Ashburton
One NZ (Previously Vodafone NZ)	Electronics store	Mobile phones	63	19	One NZ	1998	Takapuna, Auckland
OPSM	Eyewear store	Eyewear	55	23	Luxottica	1932	North Ryde, Australia
PAK'nSAVE	Supermarket	Groceries, liquor	57	17	Foodstuffs	1985 in Kaitaia	Māngere, Auckland
Palmers Garden Centre	Garden centre	Plants, garden equipment	12	3	Palmers Garden Centre	1912 in Glen Eden, Auckland	Rosedale, Auckland
Paper Plus	Bookstore	Books, stationery, toys	91	22	Paper Plus Group	1990 (through rebranding of National Stationers established in 1983)	Penrose, Auckland
Partridge Jewellers	Jewellery store	Jewellery, watches	7	4	Partridge Jewellers	1877 in Wellington CBD	Wellington CBD
Pascoes the Jewellers	Jewellery store	Jewellery	41	12	James Pascoe Group	1906 in Auckland CBD	Auckland CBD
Peter Alexander	Clothing store	Clothing, children's clothing, homeware	15	7	Just Group	Unknown	Melbourne, Australia
Pita Pit New Zealand	Fast food outlet	Pita sandwiches	85	36	Pita Pita New Zealand	2007 in Takapuna, Auckland	Takapuna, Auckland
Pizza Hut New Zealand	Fast food outlet	Pizza	84	33	Restaurant Brands	1974 in New Lynn, Auckland	Penrose, Auckland
PlaceMakers	Hardware store	Building supplies, household hardware, paint, power tools	62	11	Fletcher Building	1954 in Penrose, Auckland	Panmure, Auckland
Platypus	Shoe store	Shoes	26	11	Accent Group	2013 in Auckland CBD	Melbourne, Australia
Portmans	Clothing store	Clothing (women's), fashion accessories	11	5	Just Group	Unknown	Melbourne, Australia
Postie	Clothing store	Clothing, children's clothing	60	17	Pepkor	1909 in Reefton, Buller District	Ellerslie, Auckland
Price Chopper (rebranded as Countdown or Woolworths in 2004)	Supermarket	Groceries	11 (2003)	0 (2003)	Progressive Enterprises	1987	Favona, Auckland
Pumpkin Patch (physical stores closed in 2017)	Clothing store	Children's clothing, baby clothing, maternity clothing	48 (2010)	18 (2010)	Pumpkin Patch	1990 as mail-order business	East Tāmaki, Auckland
R&R Sport (rebranded as Torpedo7)	Outdoors store	Camping equipment, kayaks, bikes, clothing	10	2	R&R Sport	1981 in Stuart Street, Dunedin	Dunedin
RM Williams	Clothing store	Men's clothing, women's clothing, shoes, fashion accessories	3	2	RM Williams	Unknown	Adelaide, Australia
Rebel Sport	Sporting goods store	Sportswear, shoes, sports equipment	41	13	Briscoe Group	1996 in Panmure, Auckland	Morningside, Auckland
Redcurrent	Homeware store	Kitchenware, homeware, sleepwear	11 (2019)	3 (2019)	Redcurrent	1999 in Havelock North, Hawke's Bay	Havelock North, Hawke's Bay
Repco	Automotive parts store	Automotive parts, electrical, power tools, engine oils	81	18	Repco	1981	Mount Wellington, Auckland
Resene ColorShop	Paint store	Paint	60	20	Resene Group	1975 in Wellington CBD	Naenae, Lower Hutt
Rodd & Gunn	Clothing store	Men's clothing	28	10	Rodd & Gunn	1987 in Auckland CBD	Flinders Lane, Melbourne
Shoe Clinic	Shoe store	Sports shoes	19	5	Shoe Clinic Franchises	Unknown	Wellington CBD
Smiggle	Stationery store	Stationery, school bags, lunch boxes, drink bottles, toys	22	8	Just Group	2008	Melbourne, Australia
Smith & Caughey's (closed in 2025)	Department store	Clothing, cosmetics, homewares, food, gifts	2	2	Smith & Caughey's	1880 on Queen Street, Auckland	Auckland CBD
Smith's Sports Shoes	Shoe store	Sports shoes	14	3	Smith's Sports Shoes	1949 on Dominion Road, Auckland	Mount Maunganui
Smiths City	Electronics store	Appliances, furniture	23	0	Smith City 2020	1918 in Christchurch CBD	Christchurch CBD
Spark New Zealand	Electronics store	Mobile phones	63	16	Spark New Zealand	1987	Auckland CBD
Specsavers	Eyewear store	Eyewear	56	17	Specsavers	2008	Mairangi Bay, Auckland
Specsavers Audiology	Audiology clinics	Audiology services	30	10	Specsavers	2008	Mairangi Bay, Auckland
Spotlight	Homeware store	Linen, homeware, kitchenware, curtains, blinds, craft supplies, fabrics	20	5	Spotlight Group	1996 in Wairau Valley, Auckland	Melbourne, Australia
Stevens	Homeware store	Kitchenware, homeware	28	8	James Pascoe Group	1924 on Karangahape Road, Auckland	Auckland CBD
Stirling Sports	Sporting goods store	Sportswear, sports gear	60	14	Stirling Sports	1964 on Dominion Road, Auckland	Christchurch CBD
Strandbags	Bag store	Handbags, luggage, backpacks	28	11	Strandbags Group	1927 in Australia	Belrose, Australia
SUBTYPE	Shoe store	Shoes, clothes	1	1	Accent Group	Unknown	Melbourne, Australia
Subway	Fast food outlet	Sandwiches	250	77	Doctor's Associates, Inc.	1995 in Parnell, Auckland	Browns Bay, Auckland
Sunglass Hut	Eyewear store	Sunglasses	25	6	Sunglass Hut	Unknown	Milan, Italy
Sunny's Variety Stores	Variety store	Homeware, hardware, stationery, toys, cosmetics	5	0	Sunny's Variety Stores	1995 in Whangamatā	Mount Maunganui, Tauranga
Super Liquor	Liquor store	Liquor	40	10	Super Liquor Holdings	Late 1970s in Ilam, Christchurch	Newmarket, Auckland
Supercheap Auto	Automotive parts store	Automotive parts, automotive accessories	46	11	Super Retail Group	2003	Brisbane, Australia
SuperValue	Supermarket	Groceries	13	6	Woolworths (New Zealand)	1964 in Opawa, Christchurch	Favona, New Zealand
Supré (closed by 2020)	Clothing store	Clothing (women's)	19 (2007)	3 (2007)	Cotton On Group	Unknown	Geelong, Australia
Taco Bell New Zealand	Fast food outlet	Tex-Mex	10	5	Restaurant Brands	2019 in LynnMall, Auckland	Penrose, Auckland
Take Note	Bookstore	Books, stationery, toys	7	1	Paper Plus Group	2001 (through rebranding of Top Line and Paper World)	Penrose, Auckland
Tarocash	Clothing store	Clothing (men's), suits, shoes	11	4	Retail Apparel Group	Unknown	Sydney
Texas Chicken	Fast food outlet	Fried chicken, burgers	5	4	Texas Chicken	2015 in Westfield Manukau City, Auckland	Henderson, Auckland
Thirsty Liquor	Liquor store	Liquor	106	38	Thirsty Liquor	2011 in Huapai, Auckland	Ellerslie, Auckland
Timberland	Shoe store	Shoes, clothes	4	3	Accent Group	Unknown	Melbourne, Australia
Torpedo7	Outdoors store	Bikes, camping equipment, kayaks, clothing	23	6	The Warehouse Group	2004 in Hamilton Central	Northcote, Auckland
Toy World	Toy store	Toys, board games, puzzles, stationery	26	11	Toy World	1976	Parnell, Auckland
Typo	Stationery store	Stationery, gifts	16	5	Cotton On Group	Unknown	Geelong, Australia
Under Armour	Clothing store	Sportswear, shoes, fashion accessories	6	4	Under Armour	2019 at Westfield Newmarket	Sydney
Unichem	Pharmacy	Medications, skincare, cosmetics, gifts	281	111	Franchised	1981	Ellerslie, Auckland
United Video	Home video rentals					1984	
Unity Books	Bookstore	Books	2	1	Unity Books	1967 in Wellington Central	Wellington Central
Vetro	Specialist food retailer	Mediterranean food	6	0	Vetro	1999 in Ahuriri, Napier	Ahuriri, Napier
Village Wine & Spirits	Liquor store	Wine, spirits	4	4	The Trusts	1972	New Lynn, Auckland
Waitomo	Petrol station	Petrol, diesel	70	9	Waitomo Group	1947	Hamilton Central
Walker & Hall	Jewellery store	Jewellery	11	9	Walker & Hall	1899 in Auckland CBD	Auckland CBD
The Warehouse	Department store	Clothing, jewellery, appliances, furniture, homeware, toys, groceries	90	23	The Warehouse Group	1982 in Takapuna, Auckland	Northcote, Auckland
Warehouse Stationery	Stationery store	Stationery, office supplies, craft supplies, computers	67	18	The Warehouse Group	1995	Northcote, Auckland
West Liquor	Liquor store	Liquor	18	18	The Trusts	1972	New Lynn, Auckland
Whitcoulls	Bookstore	Books, stationery, games, puzzles, toys	53	19	James Pascoe Group	1888	Auckland CBD
Winner Winner	Fast food outlet	Fried chicken, burgers	4	2	Burger Fuel Group	2016 in Hamilton East, Waikato	Ponsonby, Auckland
Witchery	Clothing store	Clothing (women's), shoes, accessories	8	4	Country Road Group	2010	Sydney
Woolworths	Supermarket	Groceries, liquor	184	61	Progressive Enterprises	1929 on Cuba Street, Wellington, 2023 in Bethlehem, Tauranga	Favona, Auckland
Woolworths Metro	Supermarket	Groceries, takeaway food	4	2	Woolworths (New Zealand)	2024 at Commercial Bay, Auckland CBD	Favona, Auckland
Woolworths at Gull (sites taken over by Night 'n Day in 2011)	Supermarket	Groceries	21 (2011)	11 (2008)	Progressive Enterprises	2001	Favona, Auckland
yd.	Clothing store	Clothing (men's), shoes	8	4	Retail Apparel Group	2008	Sydney
Z Energy	Petrol station	Petrol, diesel	227	60	Z Energy	1912	Wellington CBD
Zara	Clothing store	Clothing, cosmetics, shoes, lingerie	1	1	Zara SA	2015	Arteixo, Spain

== See also ==
- List of shopping centres in New Zealand
- Retailing in New Zealand
- Hospitality industry in New Zealand
