= Invercargill Central Mall =

New Zealand shopping centre

Invercargill Central
- Location: Invercargill, New Zealand
- Coordinates: 46.412°S 168.348°E
- Opened: 14 July 2022; 4 years ago
- Architect: Buchan Group
- Parking: 675
- Website: invercargillcentral.nz

Invercargill Central is a shopping centre located in the central business district of Invercargill, New Zealand. Stage one of the project opened on 14 July 2022. The BusSmart Hub is outside Invercargill Central. All stores on the ground floor are open.

== History ==
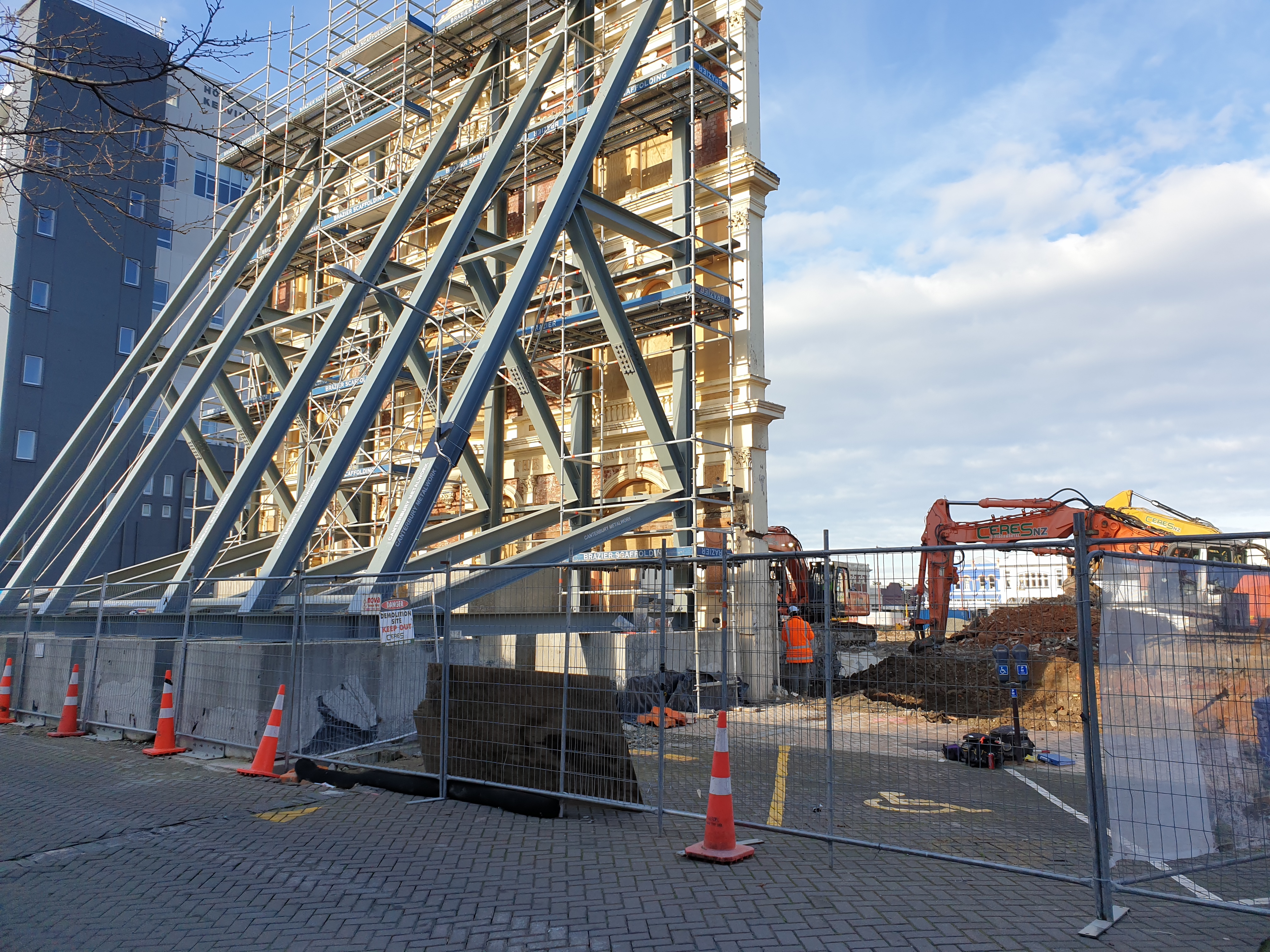
Demolition of The Southland Times building in 2020 with the facade retained

A survey conducted in April 2015 found the occupancy rate of Invercargill's central business district to be at its lowest point since 2003, and several buildings were assessed to be earthquake-prone. In March 2017, the Invercargill City Council and HWR Group formed HWCP Management Limited with the purpose of redeveloping the CBD. Later that year, they purchased 90% of properties on the CBD block bordered by Esk, Dee, Don, and Kelvin Streets, including the former The Southland Times building. The newspaper's building vendor was the Invercargill Licensing Trust, which had owned it since 2015 and planned to build a hotel there. HWCP unveiled their plan for the redevelopment of the block in June 2018, with designs from The Buchan Group. The development was confirmed in August 2019, with funding secured and Farmers set to be the anchor tenant.

Demolition started in January 2020 and was completed in September, with Hannahs being the final building removed. 43 buildings in total were demolished. However, three heritage façades were retained, including the façade of the former Southland Times building. Current and former Southland Times staff were invited to sign the façade before it was plastered over. Several archeological artefacts were unearthed, including the foundation of the city's first brick building. During the demolition, local artists were invited to design artworks to decorate the safety barriers of the demolition site.

Construction began in October 2020. In March 2021, an intoxicated 61 year old man was arrested and charged after he climbed one of the cranes at the site. A time capsule was embedded in a wall of the building, to be opened in 2072, the 50th anniversary of the opening of the mall.

Stage one opened on 14 July 2022, with Farmers, Glassons, Amazon, Michael Hill, Pascoes Jewellery, Merchant 1948, Pagani, 2degrees, Mobile King, Mister Minit, and 300 carparks. The Coffee Club, Just Cuts, EB Games, and Cotton On opened in the following weeks, with Flawless Face and Beauty expected in late October. The stage one opening was originally set for November 2021, but was delayed multiple times due to the COVID-19 pandemic. Invercargill Central reportedly recorded over 13,000 weekly visitors during stage one.

Stage two is set for November, and will include Bánh Mì, Max and Barkers, Hallensteins, Lovisa, Cosmetic Clinic, Starbucks, Sal's Pizza, ReBurger, Wing Wing Korean Street Food, Platypus Shoes, and an additional 350 parking spaces. Stage three is set for February 2023, and will include a bowling alley, Timezone, and the linking of Reading Cinemas to the mall.

== Tenants ==
The anchor store of Invercargill Central is Farmers, relocated from their former location of 150 Dee Street. Other fashion outlets include Merchant 1948, Pagani, Hallensteins, Glassons, Amazon, Pascoes, Michael Hill Jeweller, Lovisa Jewellery, a Cotton On megastore, and a combined Max and Barkers store. Eateries are split between two areas, the Esk St Eats dining precinct and the Tay St food court, and include Sal's Pizza, Majestic, The Coffee Club, Japanese Noodles and Sushi, ReBurger, Starbucks, Wing Wing Korean Street Food, Temptation Desserts, AR Indian, Kebabs, and Bánh Mì Vietnamese Street Food. Health and beauty stores include Just Cuts, Modern Mens Barber, Flawless Face and Beauty, Cosmetic Clinic, and Unichem Pharmacy. Other stores are 2degrees, Tech Pro, Mobile King, and Mister Minit. Additionally, Invercargill Central purchased the Reading Cinemas building on Dee Street, which will be refurbished to have an entrance from the mall. Ballantynes department store will also be opening a branch at the mall as a smaller location called Ballantynes Select.

== Parking ==
Invercargill Central includes a multistorey car park, which contains 675 parking spaces. All 675 parking spaces are open. Parking is free for up to 30 minutes. Bicycle parking and electric vehicle charging stations will be included in stage two.
