= Vogue Jewellers =

Sri Lankan jewellery store

- Type: Private limited company
- Industry: Retail
- Founded: 1962; 64 years ago
- Founder: Sarath Hemachandra
- Headquarters: Sri Lanka
- Area served: Sri Lanka, Australia
- Products: Jewellery, gemstones (Blue Sapphire, Yellow Sapphire, Pink Sapphire, Ruby, Emerald)
- Brands: Vogue Tusker Collection

Vogue Jewellers is a Sri Lankan jewellery store, operating as a private limited company. The store is known for displaying a variety of Blue Sapphire, Yellow Sapphire, Pink Sapphire, Ruby, Emarald and Ceylon stones at their showrooms.

== Corporate history ==
Vogue Jewellers was established in 1962 by Sarath Hemachandra. During the 1960s, radio jingle "Mangala mudu mala valalu" penned by lyricist Karunaratne Abeysekera, was specifically created for Vogue Jewellers and it became one of the first few jingles to have been used in Sri Lanka. The Radio jingle "Mangala mudu mala valalu" was converted into a television commercial and Bollywood singer Sonu Nigam was brought on board for the shooting of the television commercial in 2018.

Vogue Jewellers became the first jewellery company to receive certification of ISO 9001: 2008 Quality Management System and it also became the first jewellery store in the world to be awarded the ISO 9001: 2015 certification. Vogue Jewellers was conferred with the Innovative Diamond Jeweller of the Year Award at the 2021 Retail Jeweller World Dubai Awards. The jewellery store also introduced ornaments including Chandelier Earrings, Magic Bangle, Illuminated Earrings, Nail Art Rings and Royal Majestic Collection catering to the prestige customers. The jewellery store also introduced a 22-karat patented brand, Vogue Tusker Collection as a part of its intense marketing initiatives.

In November 2024, according to a press release issued by the Central Bank of Sri Lanka, Financial Intelligence Unit (FIU) had imposed an administrative penalty of 750,000 rupees on Vogue Jewellers due to the institution's failure to meet know your customer guidelines and necessary regulatory requirements. Vogue Jewellers had failed to obtain duly filled identification documents from the high-risk customers, and it also failed to obtain necessary approvals for facilitating cash transactions in Sri Lankan rupees or in any foreign currency in excess of US$15,000. Hence Vogue Jewellers was penalized for violating the provisions prescribed in both the Transactions Reporting Act No. 6 of 2006 and Customer Due Diligence Rules No. 1 of 2018.
