= Overland Footwear Group =

New Zealand menswear fashion brand and retail chain

- Founded: 1948; 78 years ago in King Country, New Zealand
- Founder: Guglielmo Anselmi
- Headquarters: Auckland, New Zealand
- Area served: New Zealand, Australia
- Products: Footwear
- Owners: Anselmi family
- Number of employees: 450 (2017)
- Website: overlandfootwear.co.nz

Overland Footwear Group is a New Zealand and Australian footwear and fashion retail company. It operates the Merchant 1948 and Mi Piaci retail chains in both countries and produces its own footwear lines.

== History ==
North Italian immigrant Guglielmo (William) Anselmi purchased three shoe stores in the King Country, known as King Country Shoes, in 1948. His son Tony Anselmi opened a discount shoe store in Lynn Mall, New Zealand's first shopping mall, when it opened in 1963. He named it Shane's Shoetown, after his son.

He later added stores in Karangahape Road, Ōtara and St Lukes Shopping Centre.

Tony's son Shane returned to the company following the 1987 sharemarket crash.

By 2014, the company had 60 high-street stores branded as Overland, Merchant 1948 and Mi Piaci. It was designing 40% of its shoes in-house, with designers recruited from Nike or Adidas or as new graduates from the London College of Fashion.

In 2017, the company had 57 stores in New Zealand and Australia, including 13 under the Mi Piaci brand. These included 13 Mi Piaci stores. Overland stores were gradually being rebranded as Merchant 1948.

A concept store for the Deuce sneaker brand briefly operated in Newmarket, Auckland from 2017.

In early 2018, the company won an award for New Zealand's best workplace. At the time it had 450 store across New Zealand and Australia.

In 2018, a member of the Anselmi family, Oscar Anselmi, established his own shoe brand Collective Canvas.

In April 2019, a new store opened in Tauranga in 2019 as part of the second stage of the Tauranga Crossing shopping centre. In October 2019, a new Merchant 1948 flagship store opened in Auckland as part of the new Westfield Newmarket shopping mall.

In January 2020, a car crashed through the front window of the Merchant 1948 store in Taupō. Three people were injured, including a woman who was pinned against shelving.

In 2021, rival shoe retail company Hannahs was reported to be closing its Hannahs and Number One Shoes stores, in part due to rising competition from Merchant 1948 and Mi Piaci.

A Merchant 1948 store was due to open in Invercargill Central Mall in late 2022.
