= Hospitality industry in New Zealand =

The hospitality industry in New Zealand is a major industry operating around the country. It is one of the largest employment sectors in the country, contributing about 1.7% of GDP, equivalent to NZ$5 billion annually.

Businesses in the sector can be divided into four broad categories: Quick Service Restaurants; Takeaways; Pubs, Taverns and Bars; and Cafes and Restaurants. More than half of the sector's workforce work in cafes and restaurants, and more than half of sales occur in the Auckland, Canterbury and Wellington regions.

The sector has a long-term shortage of workers, particularly skilled chefs and managers. Workers do not require formal qualifications, but require customer service skills and may require certificates to manage premises and sell alcohol. The shortage of workers has been made worse due to the COVID-19 pandemic.

== History ==
In 2019, 39.1% of sales were in the Auckland region, 12.3% of sales were in the Canterbury region, and 10.6% of sales were in the Wellington region.

Between January 2020 and January 2021, the sector recorded double digit revenue declines across all categories due to the COVID-19 pandemic in New Zealand. Spending on businesses including cafes, restaurants, takeaway food, and bars was 95% lower in April 2020 than in April 2019.

In the late 2021 Auckland lockdown, the sector recorded a further 60% reduction in national activity.

== Takeaways ==
=== Chains and franchises ===
- KFC New Zealand is a chain of 102 fried chicken outlets, established in 1971 in Royal Oak, Auckland.
- Pizza Hut New Zealand is a chain of at least 100 pizza shops, established in 1974 in New Lynn, Auckland
- Domino's Pizza is a franchise of 95 pizza stores, established in 2003.
- Krispy Kreme is a chain of 46 donut shops, launched in Manukau, Auckland in 2018.
- Pita Pit New Zealand is a franchise of 85 pita sandwich stores, established in Takapuna, Auckland in 2007.
- Hell Pizza is a franchise of 79 pizza shops, established in Kelburn, Wellington in 1996.
- Carl's Jr. New Zealand is a chain of 15 burger outlets, established in Takānini, Auckland in 2011.
- Taco Bell New Zealand is a chain of 10 Tex-Mex fast food outlets, established in LynnMall, Auckland in 2019.
- Donut King is a franchise of five donut shops established in 1981.
- Jesters Pies is a chain of 12 pie shops, established in 2002 in LynnMall in New Lynn, Auckland.

== Cafes and Restaurants ==
=== Chains and franchises ===
- The Coffee Club is a franchise of 62 cafes, launched in 2005 in Queensgate Shopping Centre, Lower Hutt.
