= HWR Group =

New Zealand company

- Industry: Fuel distribution and retailing Concrete; Transport; Contracting; Quarrying; Waste disposal
- Headquarters: Invercargill, New Zealand
- Area served: New Zealand; Victoria, Australia
- Website: hwr.co.nz alliedpetroleum.co.nz

H. W. Richardson Group (HWR Group) is a New Zealand company that provides fuel distribution and retailing through its Allied Petroleum brand in New Zealand and its Petrogas brand in Victoria, Australia. It also owns companies in the concrete, transport, contracting, aggregate quarrying, and waste disposal sectors, operating predominantly in the South Island.

HWR Group is co-owned by Shona Richardson, Jocelyn O'Donnell and Scott O'Donnell, members of the Richardson family who founded it. It is one of the largest family-owned businesses in New Zealand. The family regularly features in the New Zealand Rich List, being valued at $250 million in 2011, $295 million in 2017, and $320 million in 2018.

The company's flagship brand, Allied, is used for fuel distribution, fuel retailing, transport, aggregate, concrete and waste disposal operations. It distributes 20% of New Zealand's fuel. It turns over $3 billion annually and employs 2700 staff.

== History ==
=== 20th century ===
HW Richardson was founded by Invercargill builder Robert Richardson in 1939. It began investing in the transport sector in 1939, and rapidly expanded under the leadership of Robertson's grandson into a $1 billion conglomerate.

In 1976, the company expanded into the concrete and fuel distribution sectors. In 1989, it began distributing fuel for Mobil in Southland. It 1993, it established Allied Petroleum as a joint venture with Mobil to distribute fuel to Canterbury farmers. Later that same year, it entered the aggregate sector through a joint venture in Fulton Hogan.

=== 21st century ===
In 2004, HWR Group took full ownership of Allied Petroleum. In 2006, it purchased its first waste disposal business. In 2007, it established its property investment arm, HWR Property.

In the 2010s HWR Group founded Transport World.

In 2015, the company purchased transport companies in Hawke's Bay. The following year, it purchased a 50% stake in its main Southland competitor Dynes Transport.

In 2016, HWR Group purchased a group of commercial properties in Central Invercargill, leading a strip club to relocate and an outdoor shop to close. HWR became a major property owner in the area. It sold and leased some of this land in 2020.

In November 2019, First Union members at Allied Petroleum went on strike. The union accused the company of discouraging union membership and refusing to negotiate collective agreements.

In July 2021, the announcement of the likely closure of the Tiwai Point Aluminium Smelter was expected to have a major impact on the business. The smelter had been a major client.

In 2021, construction began on a nine-storey HWR Group tower in Invercargill, with the company using the top four floors to house an office with 100 staff.

== Fuel ==
=== Allied Petroleum ===
Allied Petroleum is one of New Zealand's largest fuel distributors through its partnership with ExxonMobil. It distributes Mobil fuel to its own retail outlets, Mobil-branded sites, and various clients, including public transport providers such as KiwiRail and Ritchies Transport. It took over distributors in the West Coast, Otago and Southland in 2003, and the lower North Island in 2004. It took over other fuel distributors in Northland in 2010 and Waikato and Bay of Plenty in 2012.

Allied Petroleum is one of four smaller fuel retailers (along with Waitomo Group, GAS and Gull) that compete with the large retailers – Z Energy, BP and ExxonMobil. Allied provides its franchisee outlets with self-service systems and a regular supply of fuel with limited price fluctuations. This allows many sites in remote, otherwise unprofitable locations to operate at low cost with few or no staff. It has 69 outlets in New Zealand, including 33 full-scale service stations. Outlets are concentrated in the South Island. It has only one in Auckland. Its Pongaroa outlet, opened in 2017, is run by local residents as a joint venture between Allied Petroleum and Tararua District Council.

A Douglas DC-3, painted in Allied Petroleum branding, was suspended next to State Highway 1 at the site of a former outlet in Mangaweka. It was partially dismantled and moved away for maintenance in May 2021.

Racing driver Greg Murphy is the company's brand ambassador.

=== Petrogas ===
Petrogas traces its origins to the 1960s, and took its current form in 1985 through the merger of Metro Vac and East Oil. It became part of HWR Group in 2013. It has 12 outlets, including four in Melbourne, one in Ballarat, two in northern Victoria, and five in north-western Victoria. As of 2021, Petrogas is the naming rights sponsor of Ballarat's Burrumbeet Cup horse race.

== Other companies ==
HWR owns a range of trucking companies, including Allied Bulk, Andrews Transport, Cromwell Bulk Distribution, Farmers Transport, Freight Haulage, Herberts Transport, Hokonui Rural Transport, Kapuka Heenans Transport, Purdue Bros, Ryal Bush Transport, Ryal Bush Transport Ashburton, Southern Transport, Te Anau Haulage, Transport Services, Upper Clutha Transport, Dynes Transport Tapanui Limited and McLaren Ranfurly Transport. Most of these companies exclusively serve South Island farms and rural businesses.

The group includes concrete brands Allied Concrete and Christchurch Ready Mix Concrete, lower South Island contractors SouthDrill and SouthRoads, and quarry companies Allied Materials, Fernhill Limeworks, Rangitikei Aggregates and Southern Aggregates. It also includes several waste disposal companies, like Allied Bins, Bond Contracts and Southern Transport Waste.
