= Partridge Jewellers =

Jewellery manufacturer and retailer in New Zealand

Partridge Jewellers Ltd
- Trade name: Partridge
- Type: Private
- Industry: Jewellery
- Founded: England (1864)
- Headquarters: Auckland, New Zealand
- Number of locations: 10 (2026)
- Area served: New Zealand
- Key people: Grant Partridge (Managing Director)
- Owner: Partridge family
- Website: partridgejewellers.com

Partridge Jewellers Ltd, trading as Partridge is a luxury jewellery manufacturer and retailer operating in New Zealand. It was founded in 1864 and currently has 10 stores around New Zealand.

== History ==
Partridge was founded in 1864 in Devon, England by James Timothy Partridge. Less than a decade later, his family emigrated New Zealand and the workshop was relocated to Timaru. The company later relocated to Christchurch, and 1898, James' son, Linnaeus Partridge, who had inherited the business, moved to Wellington and opened a workshop there.

A silver salver from the brand was presented to Queen Elizabeth II on her 1954 Royal Tour. The Cuba Street store was robbed in 1966.

Partridge became the first New Zealand stockist of TAG Heuer in the late 1980s, and is also an authorised retailer of other watch brands such as Rolex, Patek Philippe, Cartier, Omega, Breitling, Jaeger LeCoultre, IWC Schaffhausen, Tudor, Grand Seiko, Longines and more.

In addition to its own jewellery collections, Partridge also sells jewels from esteemed international brands such as Graff, Piaget, Chopard, Messika, Fabergé, David Yurman, Mikimoto, Fope, Roberto Coin, Pasquale Bruni, Ole Lynggaard and more.

Grant Partridge purchased the business off of his father in the 1990s.

In 2007 the Queen Street store paid the highest rent of any store in New Zealand.

The company's first Queenstown store opened in late 2012, however in 2022 it relocated premises. In 2013 the business opened at Westfield Riccarton in Christchurch (later closed) and in 2016 a store opened in ANZ Centre in the Christchurch CBD. In July 2018 a boutique opened at Auckland International Airport (later closed). The Newmarket store relocated to Westfield Newmarket in 2021. In December 2022 a new store opened at 75 Queen Street.

Partridge opened a TAG Heuer boutique on Auckland's Queen Street in partnership with LVMH in August 2024.

In April 2025, Partridge opened its fifth store in Auckland's CBD, at 80 Queen Street, which is dedicated entirely to its own jewellery collections.

In August 2025, in collaboration with Graff, Partridge launched a new standalone boutique for Graff at 45 Queen Street, Auckland CBD, marking Partridge's seventh store in Auckland and 10th overall.

Currently the company operates 10 stores in total, seven in Auckland (six on Queen Street in the city's CBD, and one in Newmarket) whilst Wellington (Lambton Quay), Christchurch (Cashel Street), and Queenstown (Rees Street) all operate one store.

Old logo (till 2024)

== Gallery ==
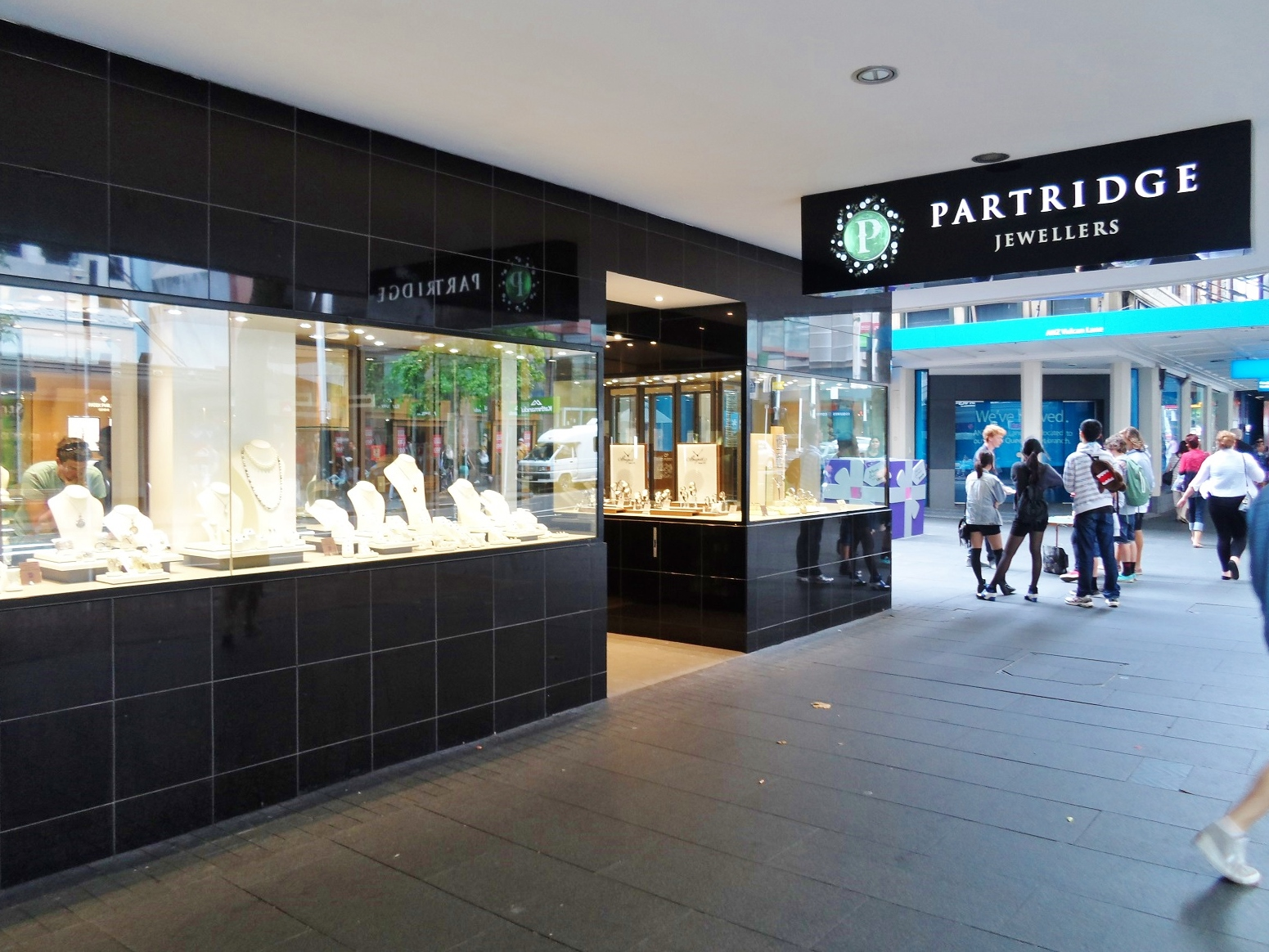
Partridge Jewellers Queen Street, Auckland

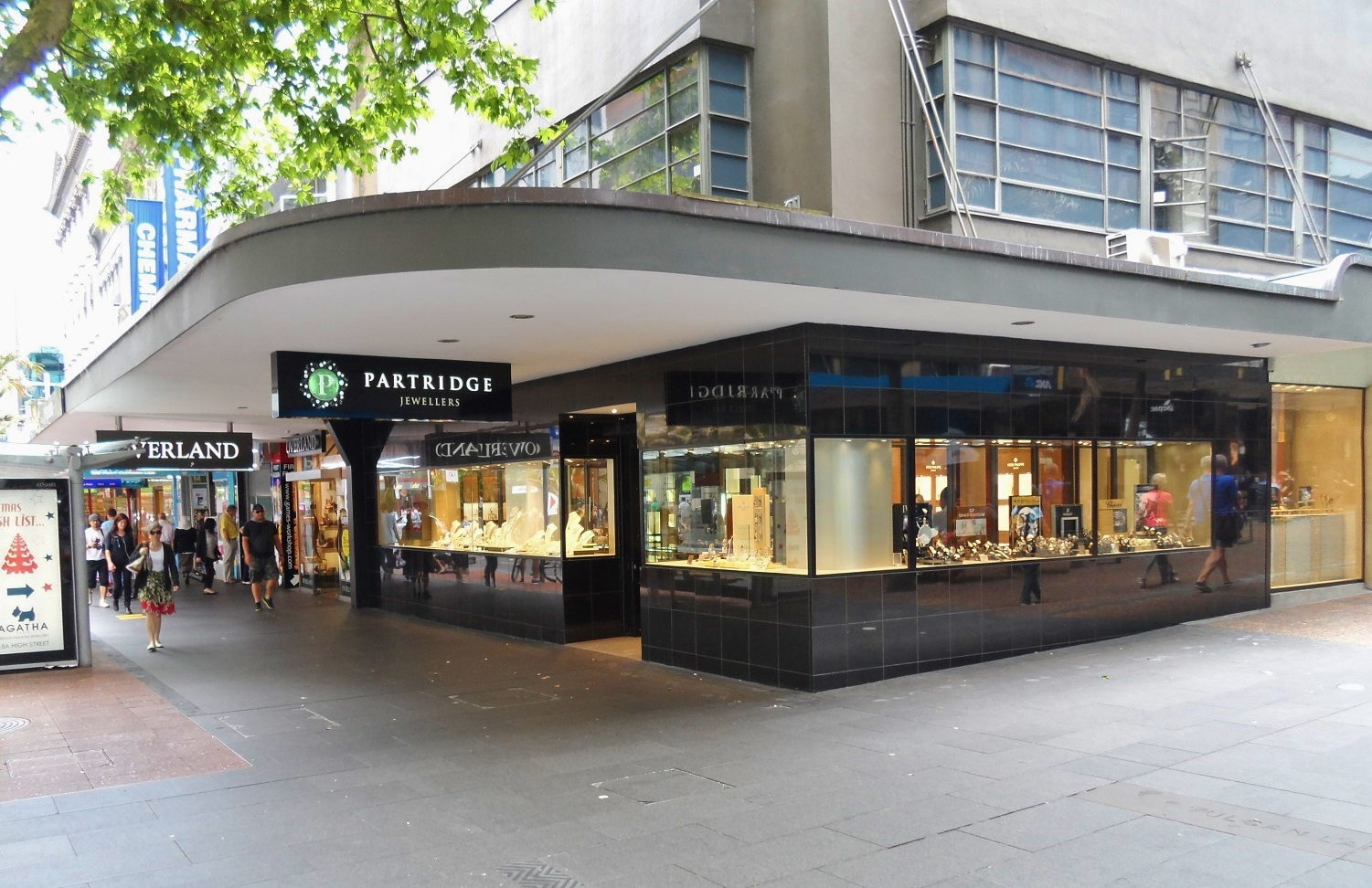
Partridge Jewellers Queen Street, Auckland

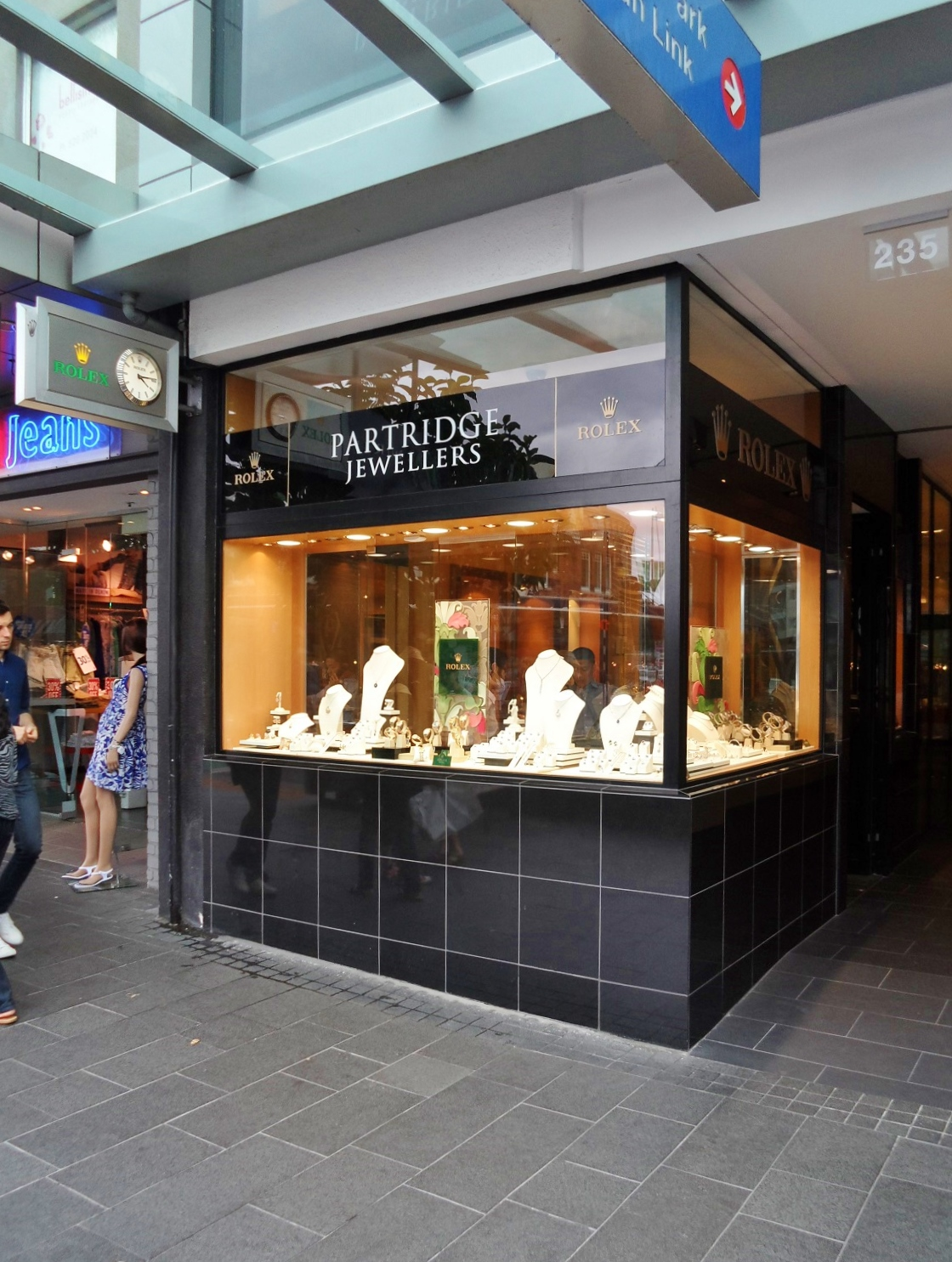
Partridge Jewellers Newmarket, Auckland

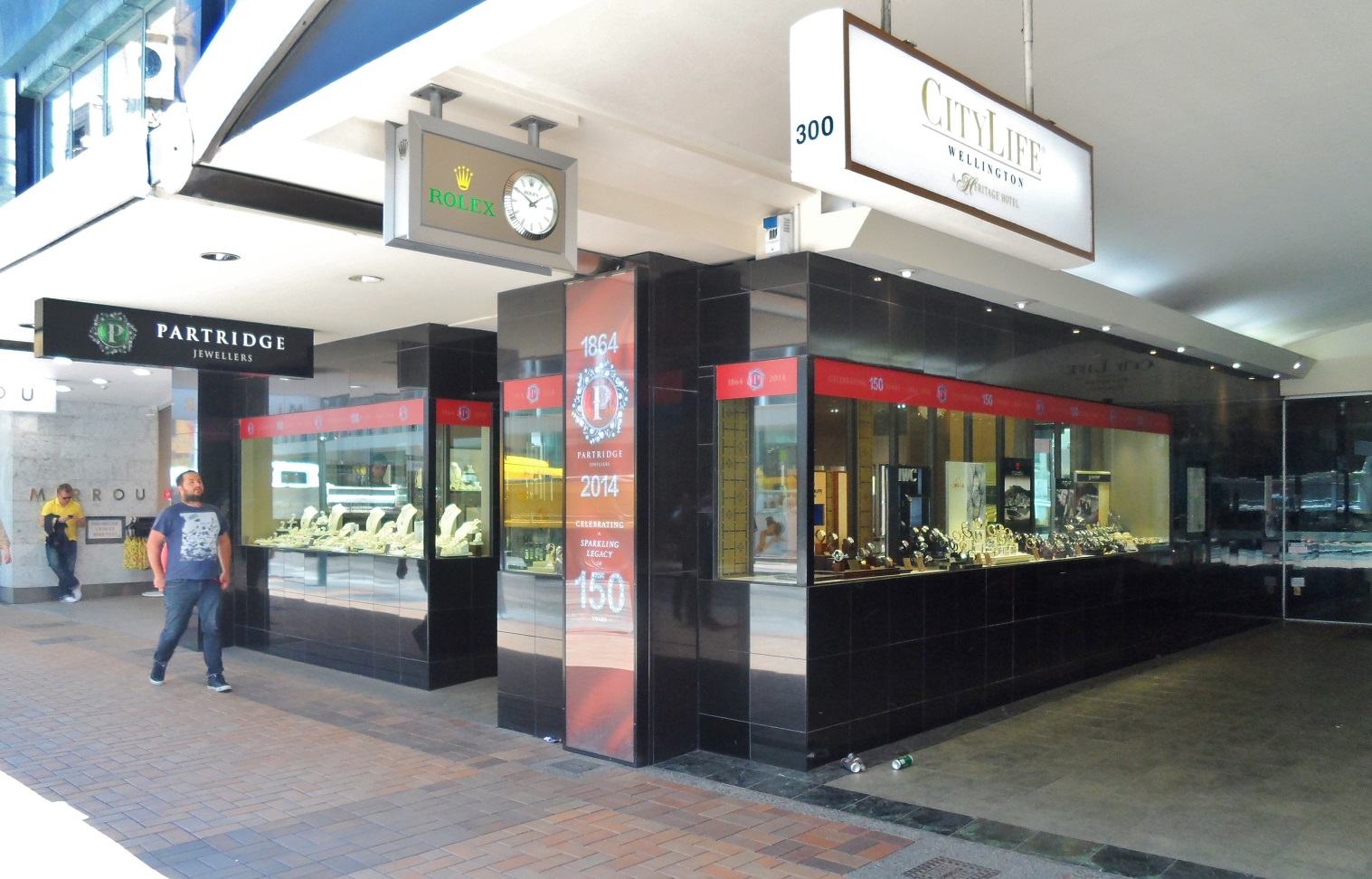
Partridge Jewellers Wellington

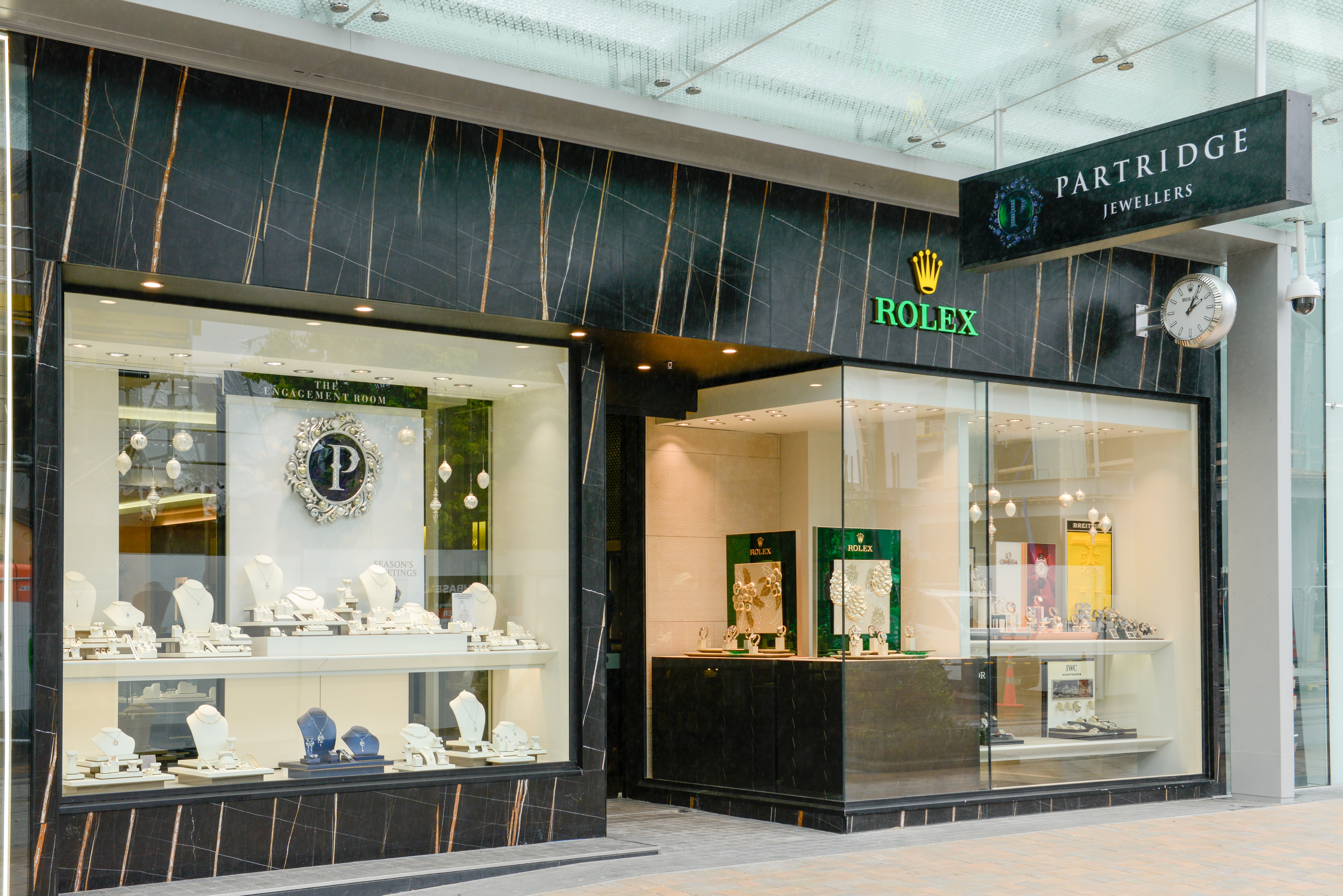
ANZ Centre, Cashel Street Christchurch

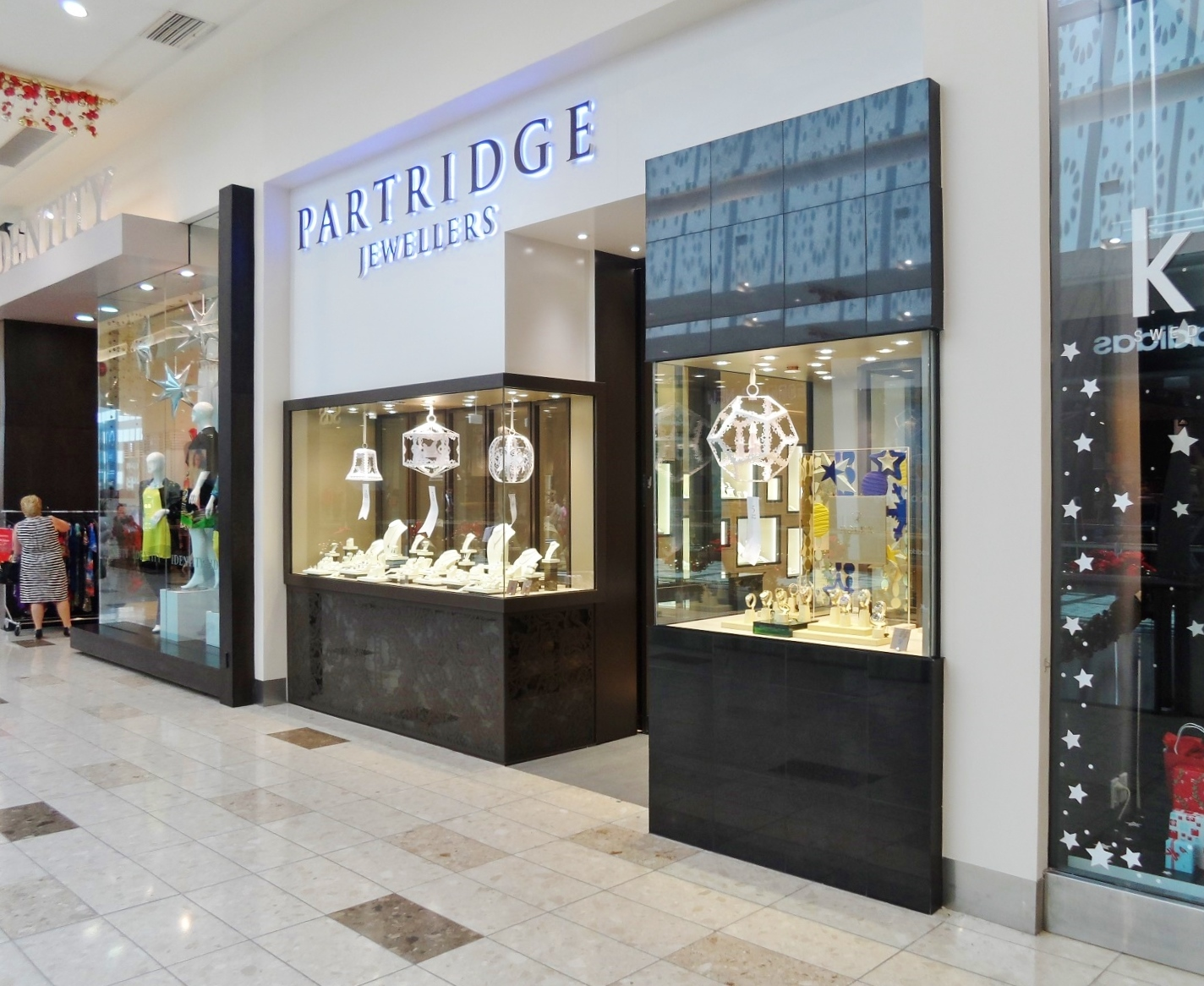
Partridge Jewellers Westfield Riccarton

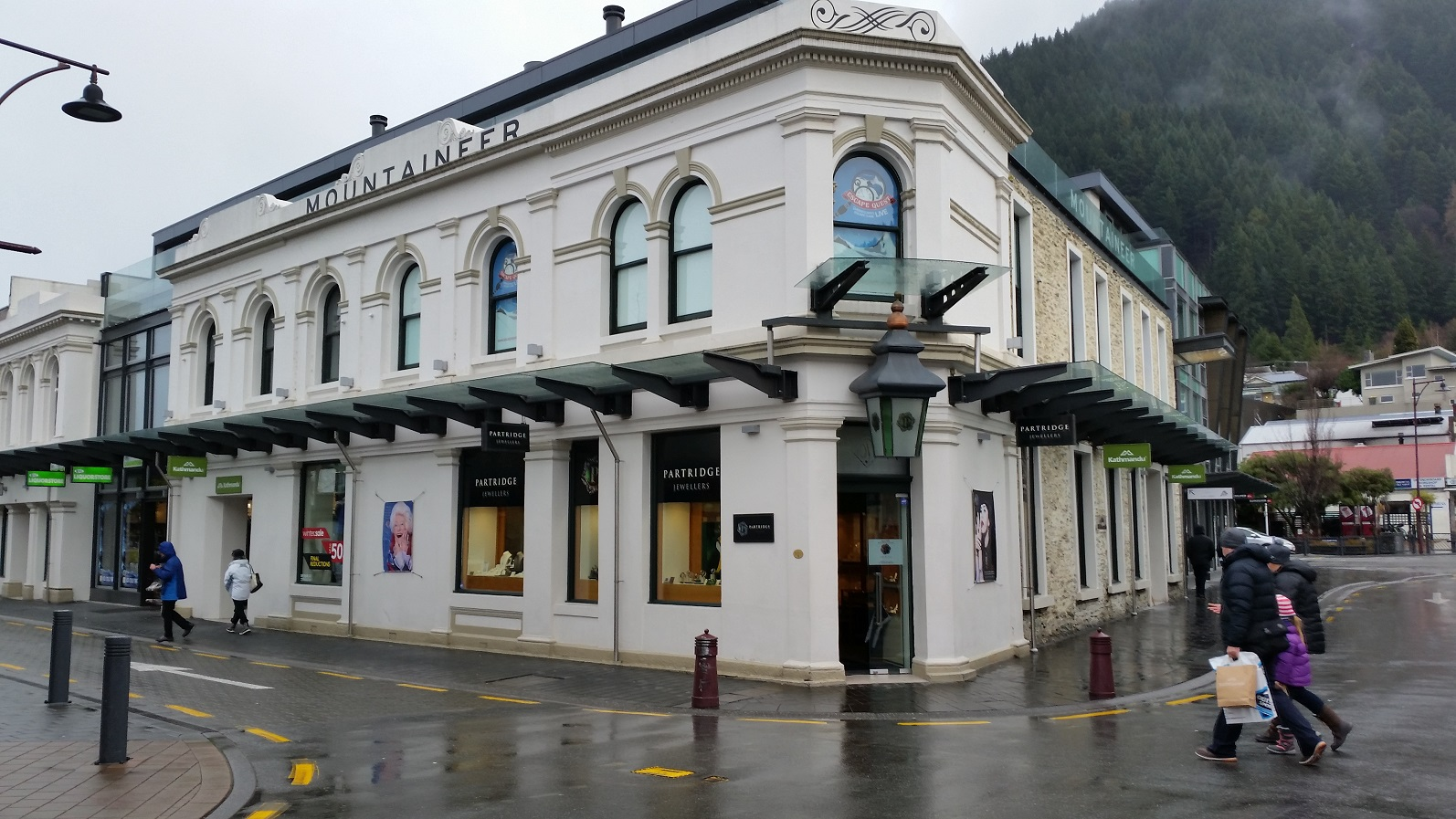
Partridge Jewellers Queenstown
