= LiquorLand =

New Zealand liquor store chain franchise owned by Foodstuffs

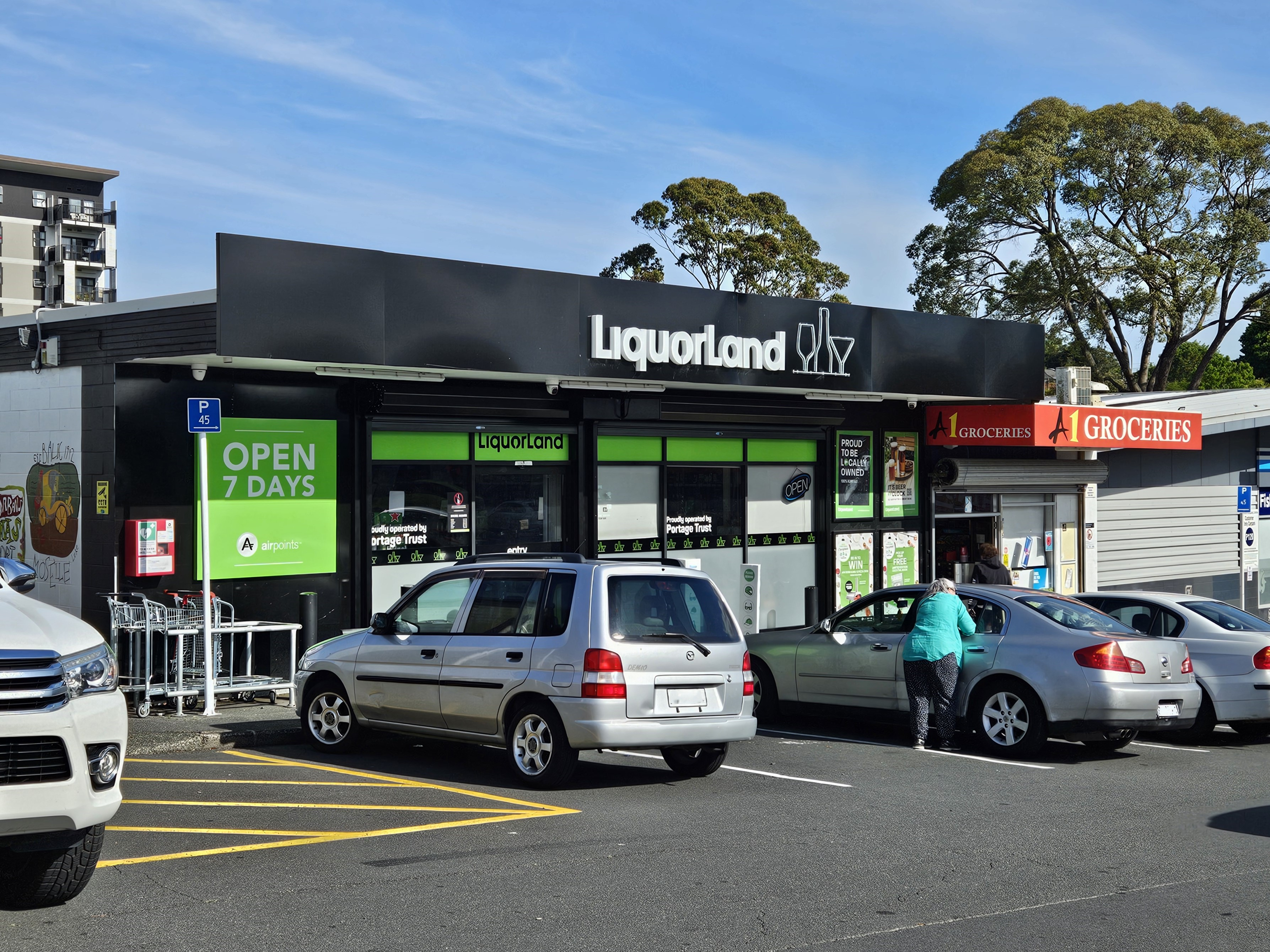
- LiquorLand Glen Eden in Auckland, New Zealand
- Type: Subsidiary
- Industry: Retail
- Headquarters: New Zealand
- Number of locations: 145 stores
- Area served: New Zealand
- Products: Liquor
- Parent: Foodstuffs
- Website: www.liquorland.co.nz

LiquorLand (sometimes referred to as Liquorland) is a franchise of independently owned liquor stores around New Zealand, operated by Foodstuffs. LiquorLand is part of the Airpoints loyalty scheme.

== Brands ==
=== LiquorLand (1981–present) ===
LiquorLand was established in 1981 as a franchise of independently owned liquor stores. By 2002, under the ownership of DB Breweries, it had 72 stores. By 2005, it had 80 stores.

Foodstuffs purchased the franchise in 2009 for an undisclosed sum. Woolworths Group had also attempted to purchase the chain.

=== Birds Liquorsave (1991–2005) ===
Birds Liquorsave was established in Hamilton in 1991. It had seven stores in Hamilton, Rotorua, Thames and Tauranga by 2005.

The Mill took over Birds Liquorsave in 2005, rebranding the stores as the Mill Liquorsave. The stores were converted into LiquorLand stores, after Foodstuffs purchased the Mill in 2015.

=== The Mill (1993–2015) ===
The Mill was established in New Plymouth in 1993. It had 24 stores in 2004, and had 31 stores by 2005. It took over Birds Liquorsave in October 2005, rebranding the stores as the Mill Liquorsave. It also introduced no-frills stores in March 2006.

Independent Brewers, a Papakura-based alcohol company owned by Asahi Breweries, purchased the Mill franchise in May 2013. The franchise reached 35 stores; most were located in the North Island but none were located in Auckland.

Independent Brewers sold the Mill to Foodstuffs for an undisclosed sum in October 2015, The stores were converted into LiquorLand stores. None of the stores were located in Auckland.

=== Duffy & Finn's (2006–2010) ===
Foodstuffs established the Duffy & Finn's alcohol chain in 2006. The first outlet, a small liquor store, opened in Porirua in August. The second outlet, a $1 million 800m² large-format store, opened in Pukekohe in November.

The chain was based on Australian liquor chain Dan Murphy's. At the time, Woolworths Group had been understood to be planning to expand the chain to New Zealand.

The Duffy and Finn's store was phased out following Foodstuffs' purchase of LiquorLand in 2009. The two stores were continuing to operate in 2011. The brand was removed from the Foodstuffs website in the last three months of that year.

=== Henry's Beer, Wine & Spirits (2006–2023) ===
The first Henry's store was opened in Queenstown in October 2006.

Foodstuffs purchased nine Imperial Discount Liquor stores in Kaikōura, Rangiora and Christchurch, rebranding them as Henry's from June 2007. The Imperial Discount Liquor franchise had been operating since 2004.

From late 2022, Foodstuffs began to phase out the Henry's Beer, Wine & Spirit brand. All 19 stores were converted to LiquorLand with the last store rebranding at the end of February 2023.

== History ==
During the initial COVID-19 lockdown in March and April 2020, Foodstuffs was required to close its liquor stores and shift to online sales. When the stores were allowed to reopen, they began surveying customers on how the stores and website could be improved.

In 2021, Foodstuffs reached an agreement with the Trusts, to allow some of its West Liquor stores in West Auckland to be re-branded as LiquorLand. Under the agreement, Foodstuffs can make recommendations on pricing.
