= Hammer Hardware =

- Industry: Retail
- Headquarters: New Zealand
- Number of locations: 42
- Area served: New Zealand
- Products: Building supplies
- Website: hammerhardware.co.nz

Hammer Hardware is a New Zealand hardware store franchise. Its stores sell a range of household hardware, plants, building supplies, power tools, paint and barbecues, with ranges differing from store to store.

There are 44 independently owned stores around the country, including nine in Auckland. The head office is located in Devonport, Auckland.

The brand was established in 1994. It had expanded to 91 stores by 2003.
