= Home decor retailer =

Type of retail business

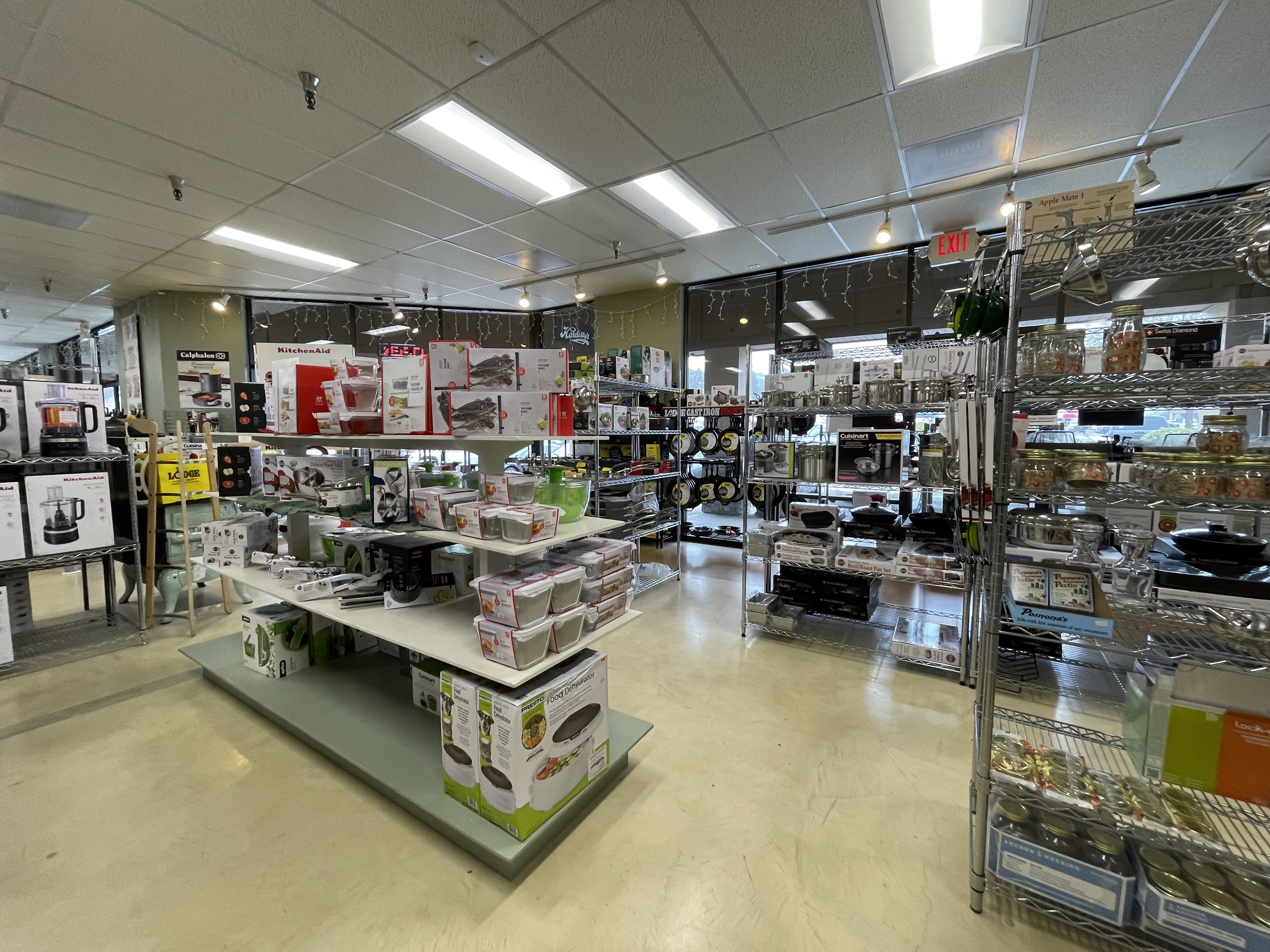
Interior of a homeware store

A home decor retailer, homeware retailer or homeware store is a retail businesses selling home-related products. Homeware stores may sell products like furniture, ornaments, bedding, linen and kitchenware.

The home decor sector was estimated to be worth US$714.2 billion globally in 2022. The success of the sector is affected by macroeconomic and microeconomic factors, human emotions, and the varying cost of raw materials. The US home decor market size was valued at US$125.8 billion in 2019, and was estimated to reach UD$158.9 billion by 2027.

There is growing demand for home decor products in developing countries with a growing middle class. Consumers are increasingly demanding trendy, unique and eco-friendly products, but bricks and mortar retailers are facing growing demand for online and low-cost retailers. The COVID-19 pandemic led to people in western countries spending more of their disposable income on home decor products.

In the United States, celebrities like Gwyneth Paltrow, Ellen DeGeneres, Reese Witherspoon, Kelly Clarkson and Chrissy Teigen have their own range of home decor brands. In Bangladesh, several social media influencers generate content popularising home decor products.

== See also ==
- Furniture retailer
