= BurgerFuel =

New Zealand burger restaurant

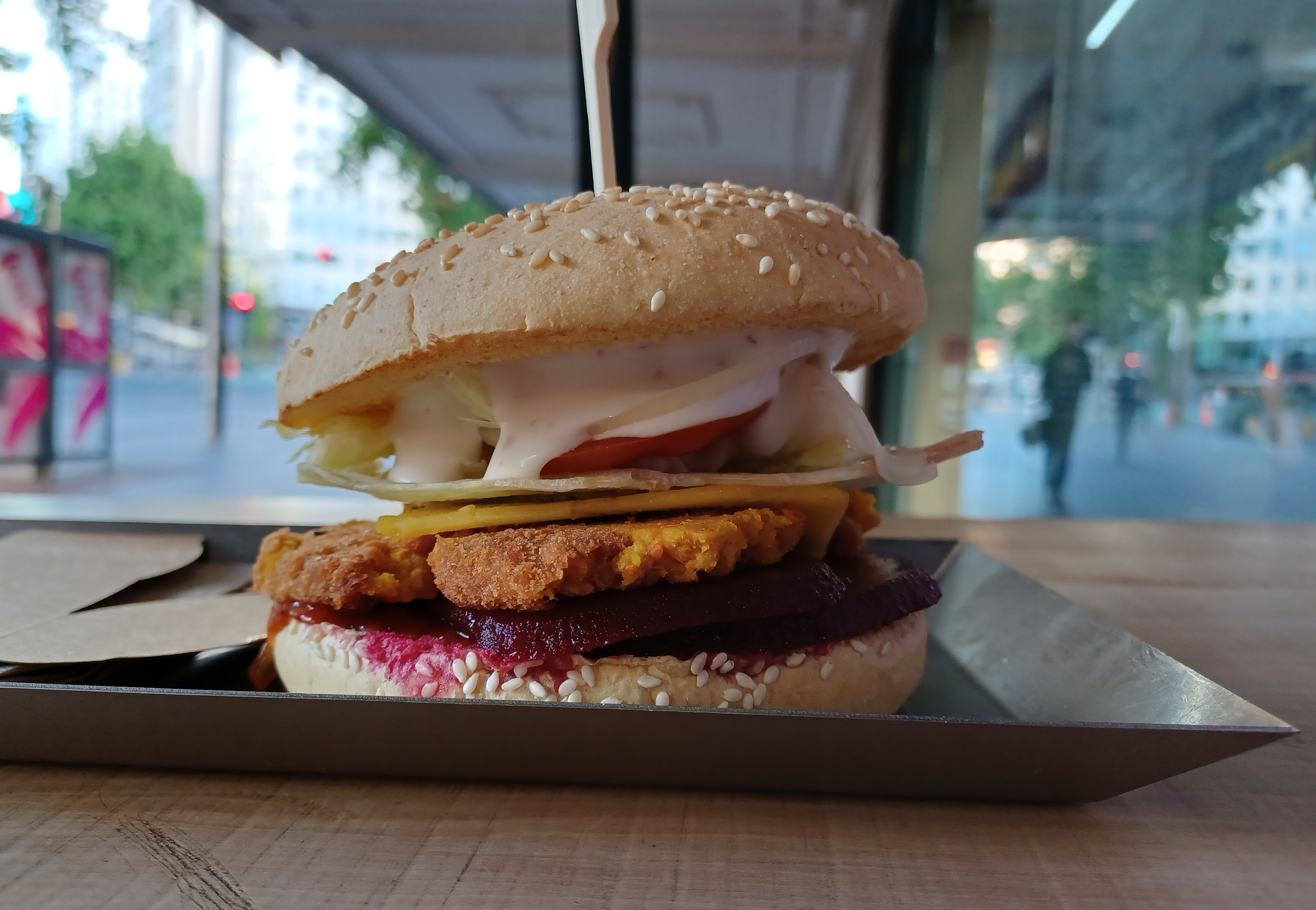
- A "V8 Vegan" burger at a BurgerFuel restaurant in Auckland
- Type: Public
- Traded as: NZX: BFG
- Industry: Restaurants
- Founded: October 1995; 31 years ago in Auckland, New Zealand
- Founder: Christopher Mason
- Headquarters: Ponsonby, New Zealand
- Number of locations: 66 (2025)
- Area served: New Zealand, Saudi Arabia, UAE
- Key people: Chris Mason, Josef Roberts, Peter Brook, Alan Dunn, Mark Piet, Tyrone Foley
- Products: Hamburgers, french fries, wraps, soft drinks, milkshakes, ice cream
- Revenue: $82,800,000
- Operating income: $18,700,000
- Parent: BurgerFuel Worldwide Ltd
- Website: www.burgerfuel.com

BurgerFuel is a New Zealand burger restaurant and franchise with 72 locations in three countries (plus 1 mobile location unit), including 60 locations in New Zealand.

== Menu ==
The menu of Burgerfuel consists of typical fast-food fare such as hamburgers, beef and chicken dishes, and fries, as well as vegetarian and vegan dishes. The burgers' names include the Bastard, the Bacon Backfire, and the Chook Royale.

== History ==
In October 1995 the first BurgerFuel was opened in Ponsonby, Auckland by Chris Mason.. In 2007, BurgerFuel Worldwide publicly floated on the NZX. The company directors were hoping to generate $15 million from the IPO; however, they ultimately raised slightly over a third of that. By 2015, the company had over 70 stores.

In January 2020, te reo Māori advocates were worried that BurgerFuel's newly launched 'Hoki Dokey' fishburger could strengthen the incorrect pronunciation of the word hoki (correctly pronounced as HAW-key).

== Expansion ==
On 5 May 2008, BurgerFuel Worldwide announced it had agreed to its first master franchise agreement with Dubai-based Al Khayyat Investment Group Investments LLC. They set up, and operated stores in Dubai, UAE by the end of the year. There are two BurgerFuel stores in Al-Khobar, and 3 branches in Riyadh, Saudi Arabia.

BurgerFuel won the "Franchise Export" of the Year award at the Westpac New Zealand Franchise Awards 2012. The judges praised BurgerFuel for not just selling high quality, gourmet products, but also for developing the company into a specialist exporter which sources raw materials from New Zealand wherever possible.

On 14 Jan 2014, BurgerFuel Worldwide announced a $5.9m injection from new US investor - Milford, Connecticut-based Franchise Brands (backed by Subway founders Fred DeLuca and Peter Buck) to fund global expansion. The purchase was for 10% of the company with the option to raise this to 50% over 8 years. They planned to assist with BurgerFuel expansion particularly into the United States market. BurgerFuel Worldwide shares immediately leapt 80% as a result to an all-time high of $2.70 per share. They have since reached a high of $3.15 per share valuing the company at over $170m. Subsequently, it has risen to be worth over $200m placing it as the most valuable company on the NZAX market.

On 4 November 2014, BurgerFuel Worldwide passed NZ$200m (US$156m) market capitalisation on the New Zealand Exchange for the first time and closed at NZ$226m (US$176m) which is a new record for BurgerFuel Worldwide.

On 4 June 2015, BurgerFuel Worldwide announced a partnership with California-based franchisor OhCal Foods as part of its plan to break into the US market. Following the death of Subway founder Fred DeLuca, BurgerFuel Worldwide decided to enter the US market alone.

On 29 May 2017, BurgerFuel opened their first United States restaurant in Indianapolis.

In October 2020 the store in Indianapolis closed ending their expansion into the USA.

It was announced in March 2022 that due to the Omicron variant of COVID-19 all UAE stores except one in Dubai would close.

== Locations ==
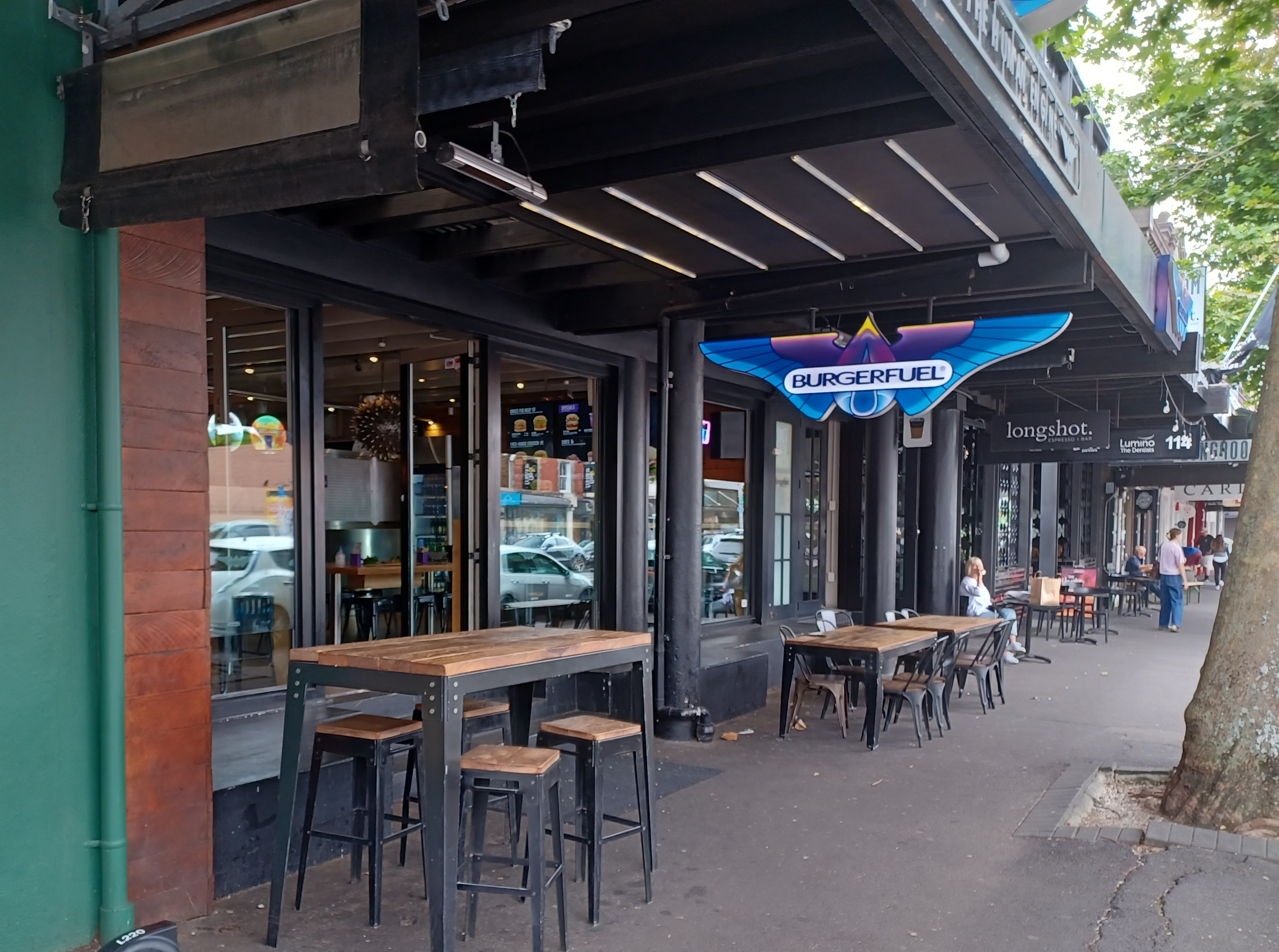
A BurgerFuel restaurant in Auckland

BurgerFuel is made in New Zealand. As of 2025 BurgerFuel has 66 stores across three countries:

- New Zealand 62 (Auckland 21, Wellington 4, rest of North Island 27, Christchurch 5, rest of South Island 4, plus 1 mobile location)
- Saudi Arabia 2 (Eastern Province 2)
- United Arab Emirates 2 (Dubai 1, 1 mobile location)

It is also looking to expand into Qatar, Libya, Lebanon, and China and include drive thrus. Expansion began in the South Island of New Zealand with the opening of a franchise in Christchurch. With the investment by US based Franchise Brands they were looking to enter into the US market with plans to open up to 1000 restaurants there. On 20 October 2014, BurgerFuel announced that they would be adding 5 more Australian stores by 31 March 2015 in Sydney, Brisbane and Gold Coast. By the end of 2018 no stores remained open in Australia.

On 24 October 2014, BurgerFuel closed its Iraq operations due to the growing threat of ISIS. It reopened a store in Baghdad in 2016, but closed the stores on 8 January 2020 after Iran attacked two airbases in the country.

== Related brands ==
Burger Fuel Group owns Winner Winner and Shake Out, other restaurant chains in New Zealand.

== See also ==
- List of restaurants in New Zealand
- List of hamburger restaurants
