= Challenge (company) =

New Zealand petrol station chain

- Headquarters: New Zealand
- Number of locations: 74
- Area served: New Zealand
- Website: www.challenge.net.nz

Challenge is a chain of independently owned petrol stations around New Zealand.

The chain is made up of 78 petrol stations, including five in Auckland. Most of the petrol stations are based in small towns and stock petrol and diesel; many have amenities and small convenience stores.

== History ==
The first Challenge petrol station was opened by Fletcher Challenge in April 1998. The lower prices of Challenge and Gull New Zealand contributed to a price war in the New Zealand fuel retailing industry.

Fletcher Challenge was split into three companies in 2001, with the fuel business becoming part of Rubicon, who sold it to Caltex New Zealand later that year. Z Energy purchased Caltex New Zealand in 2016, bringing the Challenge service station brand ownership into Z. When the offer to buy was made in 2015, Challenge was owned by the Farmlands Co-operative under license from Chevron New Zealand. From 1 April 2025, the Challenge brand became fully owned by its independent Kiwi operators. Store owners are all shareholders of Dealer Co (NZ) Ltd, and the stores trade under the Challenge brand.
