= Palmers Garden Centre =

New Zealand garden retail chain

- Company type: Public
- Industry: Garden centre
- Founded: Glen Eden, New Zealand (1912)
- Founder: A. W. Palmer
- Products: Plants, garden tools, potting mix, compost, fertilizer, weed control, garden ornaments
- Website: www.palmers.co.nz

Palmers Garden Centre or Palmers is a chain of New Zealand garden centres. It has 12 stores, including three in Auckland, selling a range of plants and gardening equipment.

The head office of Palmers is in Rosedale, Auckland.

== History ==
Starting from humble beginnings Palmers was originally a family business. The original site, in Glen Eden, Auckland, was bought by A W Palmer for a plant nursery in 1912. The new business prospered and grew with New Zealand's first modern style garden centre being built on the Glen Eden site in 1958.

There were 20 Palmers stores in 2000, including eight in Auckland.
