= Hill and Stewart =

Defunct New Zealand household appliance retail chain

- Founded: 1951; 75 years ago in Auckland, New Zealand
- Founder: St John Hill, John Stewart
- Defunct: 2010
- Area served: New Zealand
- Products: Household appliances
- Owner: JB Hi-Fi (2006–2010)

Hill and Stewart was a New Zealand chain of appliance and electronics stores in Auckland, operating between 1951 and 2010.

== History ==
=== 1950s–1980s ===
The company was founded by war veteran St John Hill and his business partner John Stewart in Auckland CBD in 1951. Hill was operating a secondhand appliance shop on Wyndham Street, when the pair gained a sought-after franchise to sell Fisher and Paykel appliances and opened their first shop on Queen Street.

The business was successful, and opened new stores in Karangahape Road, Takapuna and Newmarket over the next few years. In 1999, there were ten stores around Auckland.

Stewart's home phone number appeared on the chain's advertisements for many years, so that customers could contact him directly with any problems they had. Few people actually rang him, and those who did were unfailingly polite.

=== 1980–2006 ===
Most stores were sold to owner-operators by the early 1980s, but still operated under the Hill and Stewart name.

Stewart sold the last company store in Takapuna in 1987.

Hill and Stewart was sentenced for breaching the Fair Trading Act twice in 1999, and once in 2007.

=== 2006–2010 ===
The chain was purchased by JB Hi-Fi in 2006, to operate alongside its own network of stores. There were 11 Hill and Stewart branded stores in 2007.

Six Hill and Stewart stores were still operating in 2009. One was rebranded as JB Hi-Fi, three were closed in the latter half of 2009, and the final two were closed in early 2010. The Westfield St Lukes store continued to operate until stock was sold out.
