= Redcurrent =

Homeware retailer in New Zealand

- Industry: Retail, Homewares
- Founded: 1999; 27 years ago
- Fate: Liquidated
- Headquarters: New Zealand
- Number of locations: 11 (2019)
- Area served: New Zealand, Australia
- Number of employees: 23 (2023)
- Website: www.redcurrent.co.nz

Redcurrent was a New Zealand homewares retailer. It was founded in 1999 in Hawke's Bay by Rebecca Kain and her mother Audrey McHardy. In 2019, Redcurrent had twelve stores operating across New Zealand, as well as an online store.

In early 2023, Redcurrent was put into voluntary liquidation due to falling sales and retail challenges caused by the COVID-19 pandemic. By April 2023, the company website and social media pages were retired.

== History ==
Redcurrent was founded in 1999 in Havelock North, an area of Hawke's Bay, New Zealand. It was started by Rebecca Kain and her mother Audrey McHardy. The company began as a project importing and selling wooden animals made in Bali, and operated out of four sheds.

The company went on to set up several stores across New Zealand, including Auckland, Wellington, Havelock North, Christchurch, and Queenstown. It also offered an online store which shipped goods to New Zealand and Australia. The company had 11 physical stores at the peak of its operation, including three locations in Auckland and two in Christchurch.

In 2011, the Redcurrent store in Christchurch was damaged in the 2011 Christchurch earthquake and required repairs. Despite this, the company opened a second Christchurch store in The Colombo shopping center, only months after the disaster.

In 2020, Redcurrent went on a rent strike after the company suffered losses as the result of a nationwide lockdown during the COVID-19 pandemic. Kain protested paying rent to lease commercial space during the lockdown, arguing on a Radio New Zealand broadcast "we can't even get access to our shops so why would we pay rent?"

Following the pandemic, Redcurrent started closing selected retail stores, including its Dunedin store in 2022. By January 2023, Redcurrent listed six retail store locations, representing a closure of nearly half of its stores following the COVID-19 pandemic.

== Liquidation ==
A liquidator was appointed on 13 February 2023 after Redcurrent became insolvent, owing over NZ$5 million according to the first liquidators' report. The company employed 23 staff at the time, and the liquidator arranged closure of their Wellington, Havelock North, and Queenstown locations that same month.

The liquidators' report cited a decline in sales in Redcurrent retail stores, high lease costs, and disruptions caused by the COVID-19 pandemic.

The liquidation process was hampered by the effects of Cyclone Gabrielle, disrupting deliveries during Recurrent's final sale. In February 2023, Redcurrent continued to operate their Christchurch and Auckland stores for a short time, as well as their online store, as the liquidation process continued. By April 2023, the online store had closed as retail operations were ceased.

By the end of the process, with the business having failed to sell, 62 unsecured creditors were still owed NZ$2.6 million. Kain was subsequently adjudicated bankrupt.

== Locations ==
Redcurrent operated a number of brick-and-mortar stores across New Zealand, typically within shopping centres and malls. There were six and four stores in the North and South Island, respectively.
