= Paper Plus Group =

New Zealand retail company

Paper Plus (NZ) Limited
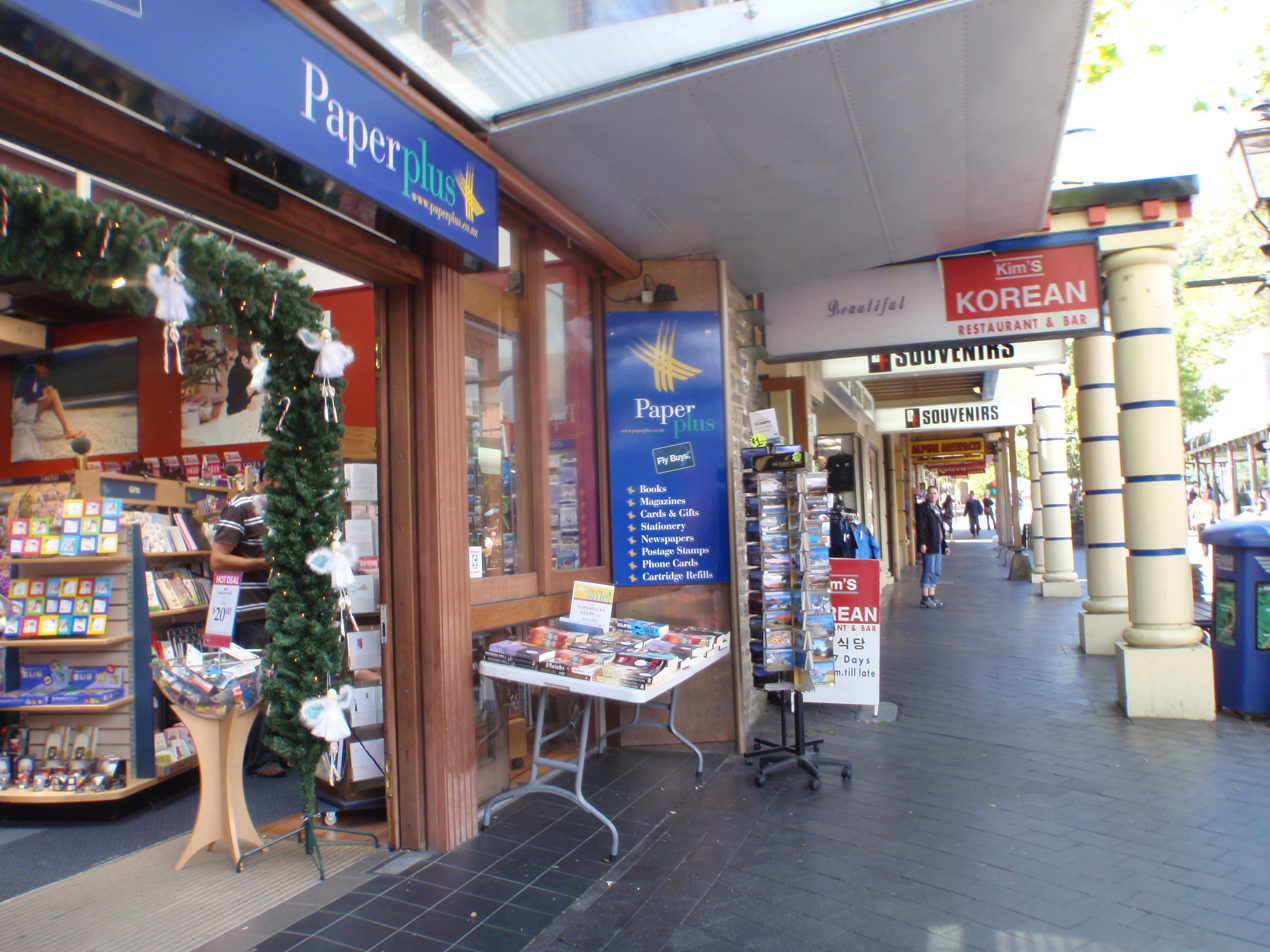
- Paper Plus in Queenstown
- Trade name: Paper Plus Group
- Formerly: Nationwide Stationers
- Type: Co-Operative
- Industry: Retail
- Founded: 1983; 43 years ago
- Headquarters: Penrose, Auckland, New Zealand
- Key people: Alastair Kerr (Chairman)
- Products: Books
- Divisions: Take Note; Paper Plus Office
- Website: www.paperplus.co.nz

The Paper Plus Group is a group of three brands in New Zealand. The group is a three brand co-operative franchise business model.

Two of the stores, Paper Plus and Take Note, sell books, stationery, cards, magazines and giftware, while Office Spot focuses on home office and business supplies.

The group had its beginnings in 1983 when five independent stationery retailers formed a buying cooperative. A common branding followed and developed into a franchise. New members bought a share in the group.

The head office of the company is located in Penrose, Auckland.

== Group Brands ==
=== Paper Plus ===
Paper Plus brand sells Books, Stationery, Toys and Giftware. Some stores have a New Zealand Post and Kiwibank agency or a Lotto store.

There are 81 Paper Plus stores, including 21 in Auckland.

The franchise began as National Stationers in 1983. It rebranded as Paper Plus in 1990.

There were 10 Paper Plus stores in Auckland in 1997.

There were 82 Paper Plus stores in 1999, including 23 in Auckland.

There were 90 Paper Plus stores in 2006, including 25 in Auckland.

=== Office Spot ===
Office Spot sells home office and business supply. The first store opened in Ashburton in 2007.

There were two Office Spot stores in 2012.

The original Office Spot store in Ashburton is the only one currently operating.

=== Take Note ===
Take Note is a stationery and book store franchise selling a range of books, stationery, diaries, calendars and toys. The chain has five stores all located in New Zealand.

The franchise began in 2001 through rebranding of Top Line and Paper World stores around New Zealand. In 2006, it had 72 stores; many offered New Zealand Post services at the time.

== Acquisitions ==
=== Books & More ===
Effective from September 1, 2005, Paper Plus (NZ) Ltd purchased the Books & More franchise chain for an undisclosed amount. This transaction increased the Paper Plus store count by 33 to 192 stores.
