= Guthrie Bowron =

New Zealand home improvement store chain

- Guthrie Bowron logo around May 2026

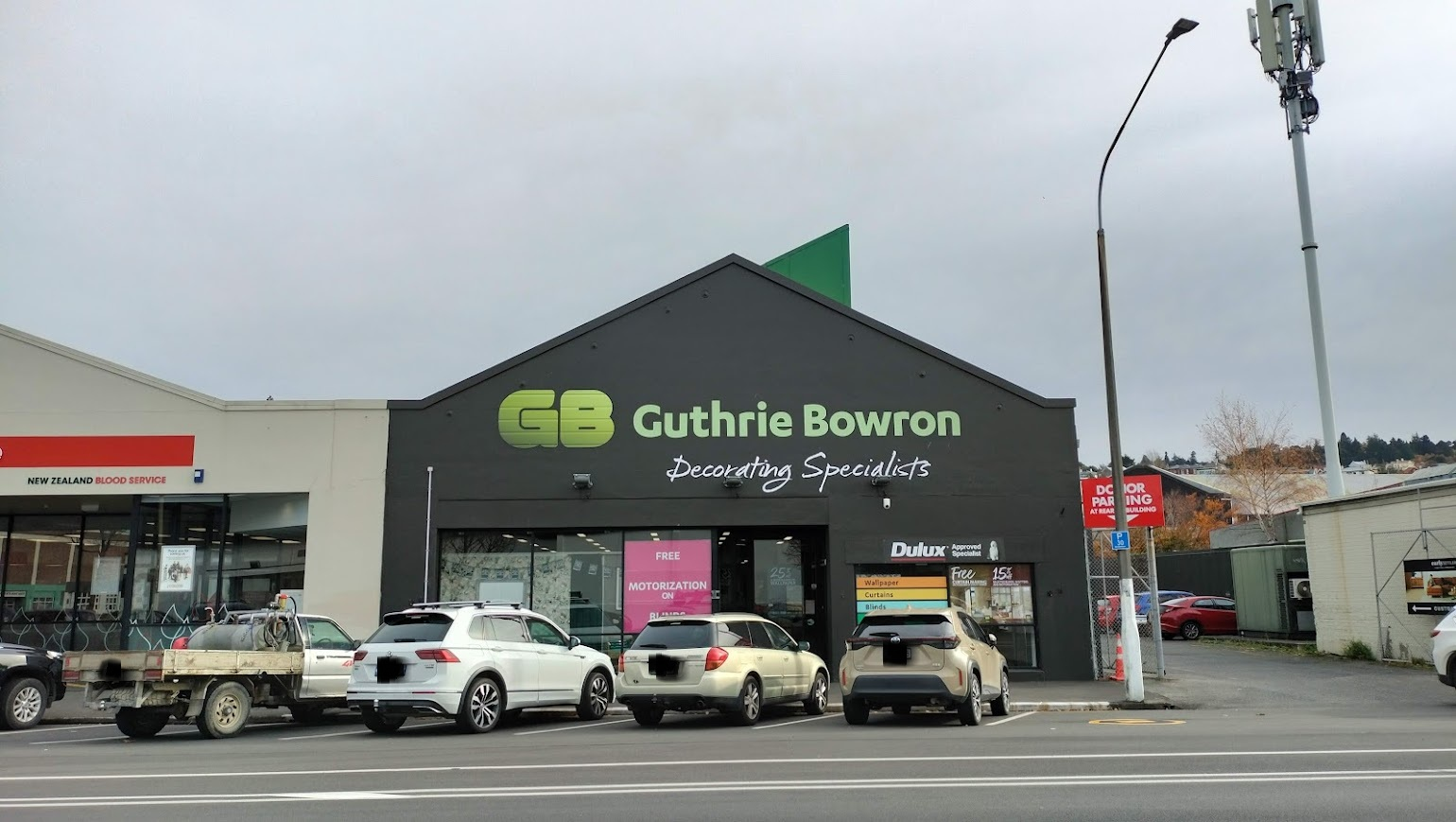
- Guthrie Bowron store on Crawford Street, Dunedin
- Founded: 1896; 130 years ago in Dunedin, New Zealand
- Founders: Henry Guthrie, George Bowron
- Headquarters: Auckland, New Zealand
- Area served: New Zealand
- Products: Paint, wallpaper, flooring, curtains and blinds
- Website: guthriebowron.co.nz

Guthrie Bowron is a franchise of New Zealand home improvement stores established in 1896. It sells a range of home decorating supplies, including paint, wallpaper, flooring, curtains and blinds.

There are 51 Guthrie Bowron stores around New Zealand, including five in Auckland.

== History ==
=== Private company (1896-1963) ===
The Guthrie Brown company was established in 1896 in Dunedin man Henry Guthrie. George Bowron later came on as a business partner, and the pair travelled around the South Island selling a range of products.

In the mid-1920s, the company started importing what were the base ingredients for paint at the time: lacquer, varnish, lead and linseed oil.

In 1932, the company became an agent for Dulux Paints; it opened a wallpaper store in Christchurch a short time later.

=== Public company (1963-1971) ===
Guthrie Bowron became a publicly listed company in 1963.

By 1969, it had 18 branches around the country selling a range of paint and wallpaper.

=== Dulux Paints ownership (1971-1992) ===
In 1971, Guthrie Bowron was purchased by ICI NZ, the owner and manufacturer of Dulux Paints.

The Masterton franchisee opened in 1973. The Waitara, Taranaki store opened as Bedfords Colour Centre about the same time, before becoming a Guthrie Bowron store 49 years later.

In 1985, the brand had 34 outlets.

=== Management ownership (1992-2005) ===
A group of senior managers took over the company in 1992.

There were 50 Guthrie Bowron stores in 1999.

=== Waterman Capital (2005-2014) ===
Private equity firm Waterman Private Capital acquired the paint store brand in May 2005. It relaunched the brand to incorporate other forms of home decorating, such as curtains, blinds and flooring. The franchise otherwise continued as normal.

Guthrie Bowron recorded an 8% increase in wallpaper sales between 2011 and 2012, and a 18% increase between 2012 and 2013. The company said wallpaper was becoming a fashion item, and many home decorators were using it to create a feature wall rather than using throughout the entire room.

Waterman trialed a new format in 2012, with a flagship company store at Sylvia Park in Mount Wellington, Auckland.

=== Management ownership (2014-) ===
Waterman sold Guthrie Bowron through another management buy-out in 2014.

In 2015, many franchises had been operating for two decades and the business model was profitable.

In 2016, Guthrie Bowron had 42 stores.

In February 2017, some franchisors told the National Business Review they were concerned about the recent closures of new format stores in Sylvia Park, Silverdale, Auckland and Christchurch. A unspecified number of franchisors called for greater mandatory disclosure provisions.

Guthrie Bowron stores were required to close during the start of the COVID-19 pandemic in New Zealand in 2020. The Timaru store reported being very busy when it reopened in late April. The store in Te Awamutu reported being "busy as" as in July, despite the local Bunnings and Warehouse Stationery stores closing due to falling revenue.

Global supply chain shortages affected Guthrie Bowron stores in 2021, including manufacturers not being able to source raw materials.

Guthrie Bowron came second to Resene in the painting and home decorating category of the Reader's Digest customer service survey in 2021. It ranked first in the home furnishing category of the Canstar Blue customer satisfaction award in 2021; it came seventh in the same category in 2022.

== Sponsorships ==
Guthrie Bowron stores have sponsored several public projects, including:

- the renovation of Nelson Rowing Club in 2020.
- a mural in Blenheim's Wairau Hospital paediatric ward in 2020.
- the revamp of the Whangārei Art Museum in 2021.
- a community project to remove graffiti from Te Kowhai township in 2022.
