= Torpedo7 =

New Zealand outdoor equipment retail chain

- The current logo, used since 2014
- Founded: 2004; 22 years ago in Hamilton
- Founder: Luke Howard-Willis; Guy Howard-Willis
- Number of locations: 24 stores (2022)
- Parent: Tahua Partners
- Website: torpedo7.co.nz

Torpedo7 was a New Zealand retailer that owned and operated several online stores, including Torpedo7 (a retailer of sports and outdoor equipment), 1-day.co.nz (an online daily deals site), and Number One Fitness (which sells exercise equipment).

Founded in 2004 by mountain bike enthusiast Luke Howard-Willis and his father, Guy Howard-Willis, Torpedo7 is based in Hamilton, New Zealand. In 2013, The Warehouse Group purchased a 51% stake in the company for NZ$33 million. It held full ownership through Torpedo7's parent company, Boye Developments Limited. Despite being fully owned by The Warehouse Group, Torpedo7 operated as an independent business.

In October 2014, seven R&R Sport stores, which were previously acquired by The Warehouse Group in December 2013, were rebranded as Torpedo7. This expansion included the addition of two new physical stores, marking Torpedo7's entry into the retail of physical stores. R&R Sport was originally established in 1981 in Dunedin as Recycled Recreation, a store specialising in second-hand sports gear.

In February 2024 The Warehouse Group sold Torpedo7 for $1 to Tahua Partners.
