= GAS Petrol Service Stations =

New Zealand petrol station chain

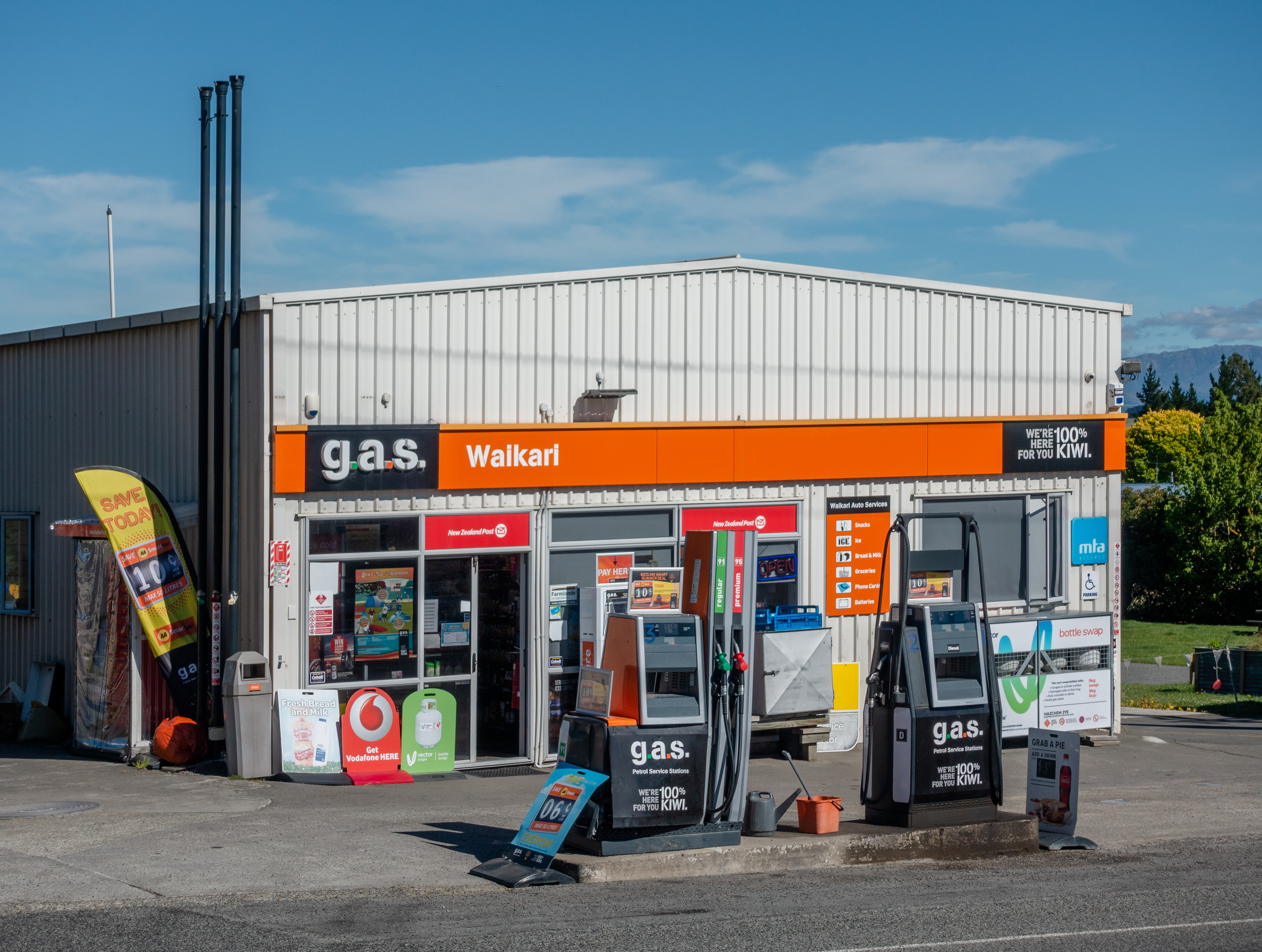
- Station in Waikari, Canterbury
- Industry: Retail
- Founded: 1999; 27 years ago in New Zealand
- Headquarters: New Zealand
- Area served: New Zealand
- Products: Fuel
- Website: gas.kiwi

GAS Petrol Service Stations (stylised g.a.s.), owned by Gasoline Alley Services, is a New Zealand petrol station franchise, which sells petrol and diesel. It has 127 locations around New Zealand, including 33 in Auckland.

The franchise was established in 1999, sourcing fuel products from Caltex New Zealand. It had 14 locations by 2000. It had 35 outlets by 2003, when it switched to sourcing fuel from BP. The brand expanded to 75 locations by 2006, and 120 locations by 2011.

The head office of the franchise is in Kingsland, Auckland.
