= Jewellery store =

Shop which sells jewelry

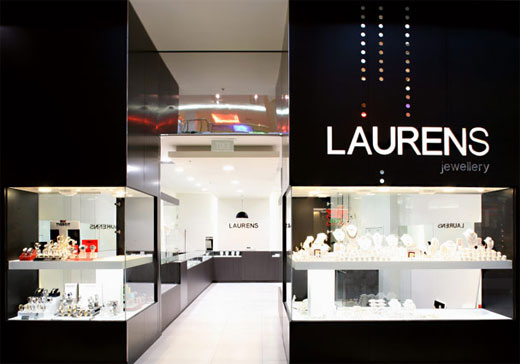
A jewellery store

A jewellery store (American English: jewelry store) is a retail business establishment, that specializes in selling (and also buying) jewellery and watches. Jewellery stores provide many services such as repairs, remodelling, restoring, designing and manufacturing pieces.
