= Waitomo Group =

New Zealand fuel and distribution company

- Industry: Fuel retailing
- Headquarters: New Zealand
- Area served: New Zealand
- Website: waitomogroup.co.nz

Waitomo Group is a New Zealand fuel retailing and distribution company. It is based in Hamilton and has 100 petrol stations around the country including 9 in the Auckland Region.

Waitomo sells Mobil fuel, diesel, lubricants and solvents through its branded petrol stations and to commercial clients, including businesses, agricultural contractors, roading and civil engineering contractors, forestry crews, workshops, quarries and farms. It also offers bulk fuel supply, onsite diesel supply and fuel and oil storage.

Waitomo Group petrol stations are no frills, with 24-hour pay at the pump systems, high-flow diesel lanes and vapour recovery technology.

== History ==
The company was founded by Desmond Ormsby in Te Kūiti in 1947. The company was still independently owned and operated Desmond Ormsby's grandfather Jimmy in 2021. Previously, Mobil owned a stake in Waitomo, but this stake was bought back by the Ormsby family in 2002.

Three Waitomo stations were opened in the first three months of 2019, including an outlet in Papamoa, Tauranga.

Waitomo Group opened its first lower North Island stores in Clouston Park, Upper Hutt in May 2019 and Thorndon, Wellington in July.

The company opened its first South Island outlet in Central Christchurch in December 2019. It opened another Christchurch outlet and two more Dunedin outlets in August 2020.

In 2021, Waitomo was involved in plans to sell hydrogen fuel at 100 locations by 2030.

Waitomo Group warned of rising fuel prices when the 2022 Russian invasion of Ukraine began in late February 2022.

The Waitomo Group petrol station in Papanui, Christchurch sold out of fuel on 11 March 2022, after the company announced its intention to raise fuel prices. Long queues were reported at other Waitomo stations around the country. The company claimed the wholesale price rise was unprecedented. It denied making the price announcement as a publicity stunt.
