= Restaurant Brands =

New Zealand fast food company

Restaurant Brands New Zealand Limited
- Type: Private
- Traded as: NZX: RBD (1997-2025)
- Industry: Quick-service restaurants
- Founded: 1989
- Headquarters: Auckland, New Zealand
- Key people: Russel Creedy, CEO; Grant Ellis, CFO
- Products: KFC; Taco Bell; Pizza Hut; Carl's Jr
- Total equity: NZ$363 million (market capitalisation 27 August 2025)
- Owner: Finaccess (2025-present (100%))
- Number of employees: 12,550
- Website: www.restaurantbrands.co.nz

Restaurant Brands New Zealand Limited (RBD), trading as Restaurant Brands, is a New Zealand fast food company. Restaurant Brands currently operates and owns the master franchising rights for the Carl's Jr., KFC, Pizza Hut, and Taco Bell brands in New Zealand. Restaurant Brands operates most of New Zealand's stores for the brands they own rights to and provides management and support services to New Zealand's independent franchisees of the remaining stores.

== History ==
Restaurant Brands was formed to acquire shares in KFC and Pizza Hut from PepsiCo. It acquired KFC in 1989 and Pizza Hut in 1995. The company originally purchased 122 stores, 91 KFC stores, 46 Pizza Hut stores and 2 Joint KFC and Pizza Hut stores.

In 1997, it listed on the New Zealand Stock Exchange with an offer price of NZ$2.20.

In 2016, Restaurant Brands shares jumped 9.8 percent on the news that it had purchased New South Wales largest KFC franchiser, QSR Pty Ltd, for A$82.4 million in cash and scrip. As a result of this deal, QSR's vendor Copulos Group will gain a 4.9% shareholding in Restaurant Brands.

In March 2017, Restaurant Brands purchased 100% of the shares in Pacific Island Restaurants Inc, the sole franchisee of Pizza Hut and Taco Bell in Hawaii, Guam and Saipan, for US$105 million. This consisted of 45 Pizza Hut stores and 37 Taco Bell stores.

In March 2019, Mexican company Finaccess acquired 75% of Restaurant Brands.

The company came into a conditional agreement in December 2019 to acquire 70 stores in Southern California, USA, for US$73 million. The purchase consisted of 59 KFC stores and 11 combined KFC Taco Bell stores together with a head office facility. The purchase was conditional on Yum! approval and the assignment of property leases. After satisfying a number of conditions, including the approval from the franchisor, Yum! Restaurants International, the transaction for 69 stores was settled on 2 September 2020.

The company experienced a decline in profits during the 2021–2023 inflation surge, due to rising food costs.

In September 2025, Mexican holding company Finaccess proposed acquiring Restaurant Brands for NZ$360 million. Finaccess already owns 75% of Restaurant Brands' shares.

== Brands ==
=== Current ===
==== KFC ====
KFC entered the New Zealand market in August 1971, with the opening of its first restaurant in Royal Oak, Auckland. By September 1973, KFC had opened nine restaurants - four in Auckland and one each in Hamilton, Rotorua, Wellington, Christchurch and Dunedin.

Restaurant Brands acquired the brand in 1989 after being publicly floated by PepsiCo. KFC is Restaurant Brands largest revenue earner; in the 2017/18 financial year, KFC contributed $320 million of Restaurant Brand's $421 million sales income.

==== Pizza Hut ====
Pizza Hut entered the New Zealand market in September 1974, with the opening of its first restaurant in New Lynn, Auckland. Businessman Garry Melville-Smith owned the franchise rights for Pizza Hut in New Zealand from 1974 to 1996. Under Melville-Smith's leadership, Pizza Hut dominated New Zealand's fast food market during the 1970s, 1980s and 1990s, capturing 75% of the market share at its peak. During that period, Pizza Hut operated as a dine-in family-oriented restaurant serving alcohol, pasta, salad bars and desserts. By 1990, there were 36 Pizza Hut stores in New Zealand. In 1996, Melville-Smith sold the New Zealand franchise back to PepsiCo, which subsequently rebranded as Restaurant Brands in 1997.

After the acquisition, Restaurant Brands changed Pizza Hut from a dine-in business to a home delivery and takeaway operation commencing 1998. This was achieved by acquiring and rebranding the Eagle Boys chain in New Zealand. The first Eagle Boys store was converted to a Pizza Hut in June 2000 and the last store was converted just 13 weeks later. The majority are now home delivery and takeaway outlets. Pizza Hut commenced selling a number of its smaller regional stores to independent franchisees in 2011.

In February 2016, the original New Lynn dine-in restaurant was demolished and replaced with a takeaway store. In late September 2024, Pizza Hut celebrated the 50th anniversary of its establishment in New Zealand by holding pop-up lunch and dinner buffet and dessert events in Auckland.

==== Carl's Jr. ====
In 2011, Restaurant Brands acquired the New Zealand franchise for Carl's Jr. The brand commenced rolling out stores in late 2012 and now has nearly 20 stores in operation.

==== Taco Bell ====
Rumours of Taco Bell being introduced to the New Zealand market by Restaurant Brands began to surface in 2011. In 2013, Restaurant Brands hinted at the possibility of further expanding and introducing Taco Bell to New Zealand, saying it could be achieved within the next year or two. Speculations resurfaced in 2015 when a Taco Bell-branded sign appeared on a Ponsonby Road storefront, later revealed to be a hoax.

Speculation of Restaurant Brands acquiring the New Zealand Taco Bell rights has risen after the announcement in 2017 that the Auckland-based company had acquired a Hawaii-based fast food operator of the Taco Bell brand, among others, that operates in Hawaii, Guam, and Saipan. The company stated that the acquisition was not a prerequisite for acquiring the New Zealand rights, but rather a move that would give Restaurant Brands greater insight into the inner-workings of the brand.

It was reported in April 2018 that Restaurant Brands had acquired the New Zealand franchise rights for Taco Bell. Taco Bell opened its first New Zealand store, in New Lynn, Auckland on 12 November 2019, with a second store opening on Shortland Street in Auckland CBD on June 16 2020.

=== Former ===
==== Starbucks ====
Restaurant Brands secured the New Zealand franchise for Starbucks Coffee in 1998, opening the first Starbucks store in Parnell, Auckland, reaching 26 stores nationwide. In September 2018, Restaurant Brands announced that it would not be renewing its licensing agreements with Starbucks Coffee International, Inc. (SCI), and with the approval of SCI, sold all fixed assets and stock of its Starbucks stores to Tahua Capital Ltd for NZD$4.4m, with the completion of sale in October 2018.

== Expansion ==
=== Australia ===
In 2002, Restaurant Brands expanded its operations overseas with the acquisition of 52 Pizza Hut stores in Victoria, Australia. The Victorian operation ultimately proved unsuccessful, with Restaurant Brands exiting the Australian market entirely by early 2008.

As of September 2025, the company was operating 70 KFC and Taco Bell stores in Australia.

In March 2026, Restaurant Brands absorbed Collins Foods' Taco Bell operations in Australia, barely saving it from being wound up by the operator, after it announced in 2025 it would sell or wind up the chain.

=== United States and insular territories ===
Restaurant Brands operates in California under the subsidiary RBD California Restaurants, operating 75 KFC stores across the state. By September 2025, the company was operating 71 KFC and Taco Bell stores in California.

As of September 2025, the company was operating 70 Taco Bell and Pizza Hut stores in Hawaii, Guam and Saipan.
