= Hannahs =

New Zealand menswear fashion brand and retail chain

Hannahs Number One Shoes
- Headquarters: Auckland, New Zealand
- Area served: New Zealand
- Products: Footwear
- Website: hannahs.co.nz numberoneshoes.co.nz

Hannahs is a New Zealand footwear retail company.

Hannahs operates at 70 locations around New Zealand: 34 under its main Hannahs brand, 16 under its low-price Number One Shoes brand, and 20 as combined Number One Shoes and Hannahs stores.

== History ==
=== 19th century ===
Irish cobbler Robert Hannah emigrated from Ireland to New Zealand, via Australia, in 1866. He traveled to Charleston, New Zealand for work, where he was forced to add an "H" to his surname after losing a coin toss with another man with the same surname.

Hannah established his first store, R. Hannah & Co., in Charleston, New Zealand on 29 January 1868. It produced high-quality shoes for gold miners during the end of the West Coast gold rush.

Business quickly declined as gold started to run out. Miners left the area and property owners abandoned their land. Hannah originally planned to relocate to the United States but chose to move to Wellington instead.

Hannah established a new shop on Lambton Quay in 1870. He established a three-storey shop and factory, between Cuba Street and Leeds Street, in 1874.

Hannah quickly established branches around the country. In 1883, he established a store on Hastings Street in Napier. Two others followed on Heretaunga Street in Hastings. By 1893, Hannah has 10 shops and his factory employed more than 250 people. At its peak, the factory was capable of producing 6,000 pairs of shoes a week.

The company also became a major landowner, leasing commercial property on Cuba Street to other businesses.

Robert's brother William took over the three Napier and Hastings store in 1897. The Napier site became a street storey store, regional office and warehouse.

=== 20th century ===
In addition to his shop on Leeds Street, Hannah also had two factories on Lambton Quay at different times.

During the start of the Great Depression, Hannah reportedly put in his own orders to his factory to keep staff in employment.

Robert Hannah died of pneumonia in 1930. At the time, he had 19 stores in the North Island and 11 in the South Island, in addition to his factory.

The Napier and Hastings stores were destroyed in the 1931 Hawke's Bay earthquake, along with a new shipment of English shoes and other stock.

Three stores at one of the Hastings stores died. William Hannah was visiting his accountant at the time; the two men grabbed each other and made it out of the three-storey YMCA building they were in without injury.

Robert Hannah's son brought William Hannah and his family back to the family home in Wellington. William initially lived in a tent outside the house as he no longer trusted being inside a building. A few years later he returned to Hawke's Bay, living in a tent while he rebuilt the business in Napier and Hastings.

The First Labour Government started restricting footwear imports and increasing import tariffs in 1938 to protect the local footwear industry.

In 1983 the New Brighton, Christchurch Hannahs store was one of the first retailers in Canterbury to trade on a Saturday.

The Fourth Labour Government removed import restrictions on footwear and began lowering in the late 1980s, leading to a sharp increase in the volume of shoes imported from China and other Asian countries. Many local shoe manufacturers closed

Richard Johnson, Robert Hannah's great-great grandson, has worked for Hannahs as a staff member and consultant.

=== 1990s ===
The site of the original Leeds Street factory was converted into residential apartments during the 1996. A section of Leeds Street is now called Hannahs Laneway.

Hannahs launched its own footwear brand Pulp in 1997.

The company relocated its headquarters to Porirua in 1999.

=== 2000s ===
During the late 1990s and early 2000s, Hannahs stated to stock a range of international footwear and accessory brands, including Hush Puppies, Steve Madden, Ipanema x Gisele Bundchen, Kardashian Kollection handbags, Truth or Dare by Madonna and Keds.

In 2005, Hannahs owner Hellaby Holdings purchased Number 1 Shoe Warehouse for $22 million.

=== 2010s ===
In 2010, there were 48 stores around New Zealand branded as Number 1 Shoe Warehouse. The stores were all rebranded as Number One Shoes in 2012, as the chain shifted its focus to affordable "trendy" shoes.

In 2012, the Commerce Commission formally warned Number One Shoes for advertising children's shoes made of vinyl and less-quality leather as "full-grain leather". It was the second time the Commission had investigated the chain over its claims. The chain said it mainly sold synthetic shoes and had made a "mistake in terminology".

In 2014, Number One Shoes was the largest footwear retailer in New Zealand. In November of that year, it signed its first New Zealand supply deal with Christchurch gumboot manufacturer Sandford Industries.

Hannahs and Number One Shoes went through changes of ownership in 2015 and 2017. At the time of the 2017 sale, there were 51 Hannahs stores and 89 Number One Shoes stores, which employed hundreds of people and represented about a quarter of the New Zealand footwear market.

In 2018, Hannahs marked its 150th anniversary. It had 50 stores and was the country's largest retailer of international footwear brands such as Clarks, Hush Puppies and Keds.

In May 2021, an employee at the Number One Shoes store in Palmerston North was arrested for allegedly taking photos of co-workers and customers before performing lewd acts with their shoes the previous month. Newshub reported he had allegedly posted images of up to 250 teenage girls on Facebook. He pleaded guilty to two charges of offensive behaviour, and was discharged without conviction.

In 2021, Hannahs was starting to close its "shabby" or under-performing stores or merge stores with Number One Shoes. The chain had been losing market share to rival chain Merchant 1948, department stores and online retailers due to its conservative business model.
