= Westfield Newmarket =

Coordinates: 36.870901°S 174.776301°E

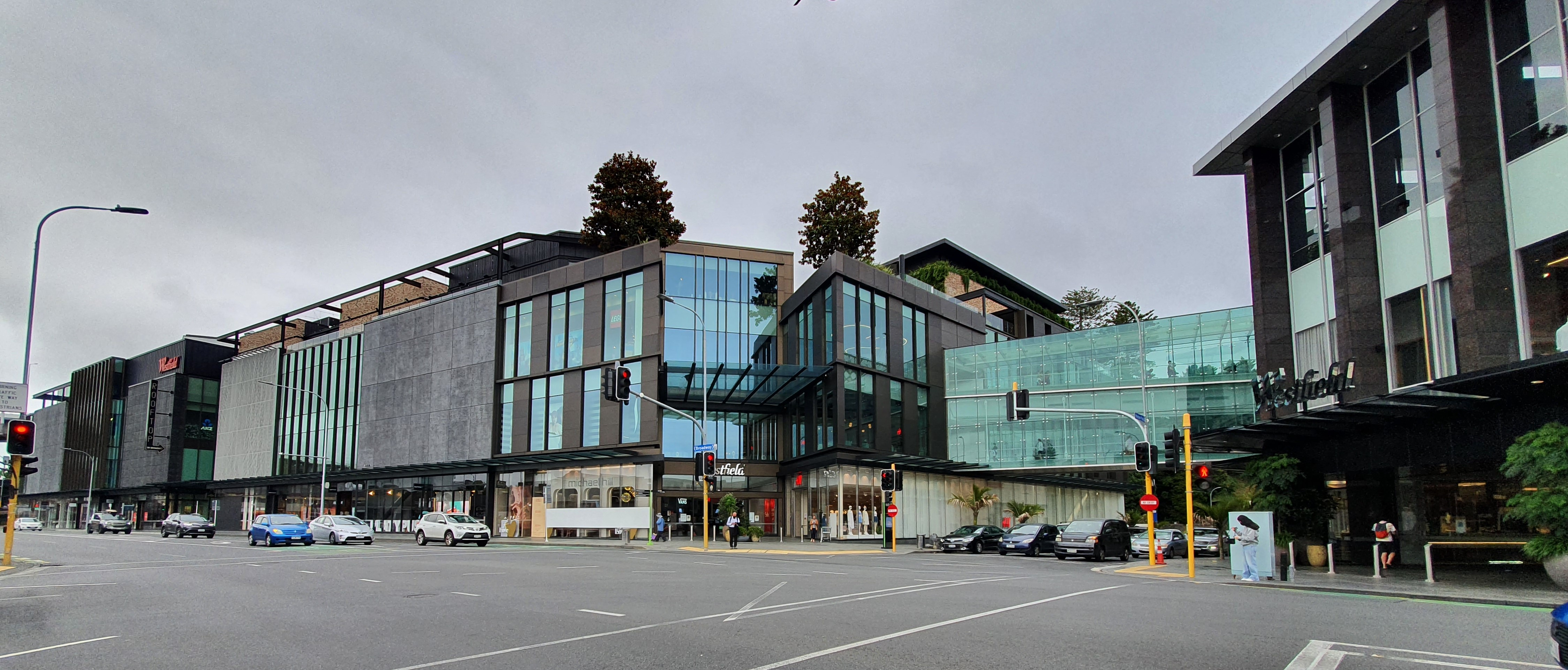
- Location: Newmarket, Auckland, New Zealand
- Address: 277–309 Broadway
- Opened: August 29, 2019; 7 years ago (after refurbishment)
- Owner: Scentre Group
- Num. of stores: 258
- Parking: 2,800
- Website: www.westfield.co.nz/newmarket

Westfield Newmarket is a shopping centre in Newmarket, a central suburb of Auckland, New Zealand. The centre initially opened in the 1980s; in early 2018, the centre closed for a major re-build and expansion; it re-opened in August 2019 after an 18 month closure. The centre is located at 277 Broadway and, since expansion, 309 Broadway; it was often referred to simply as 277 prior to refurbishment.

== Overview ==
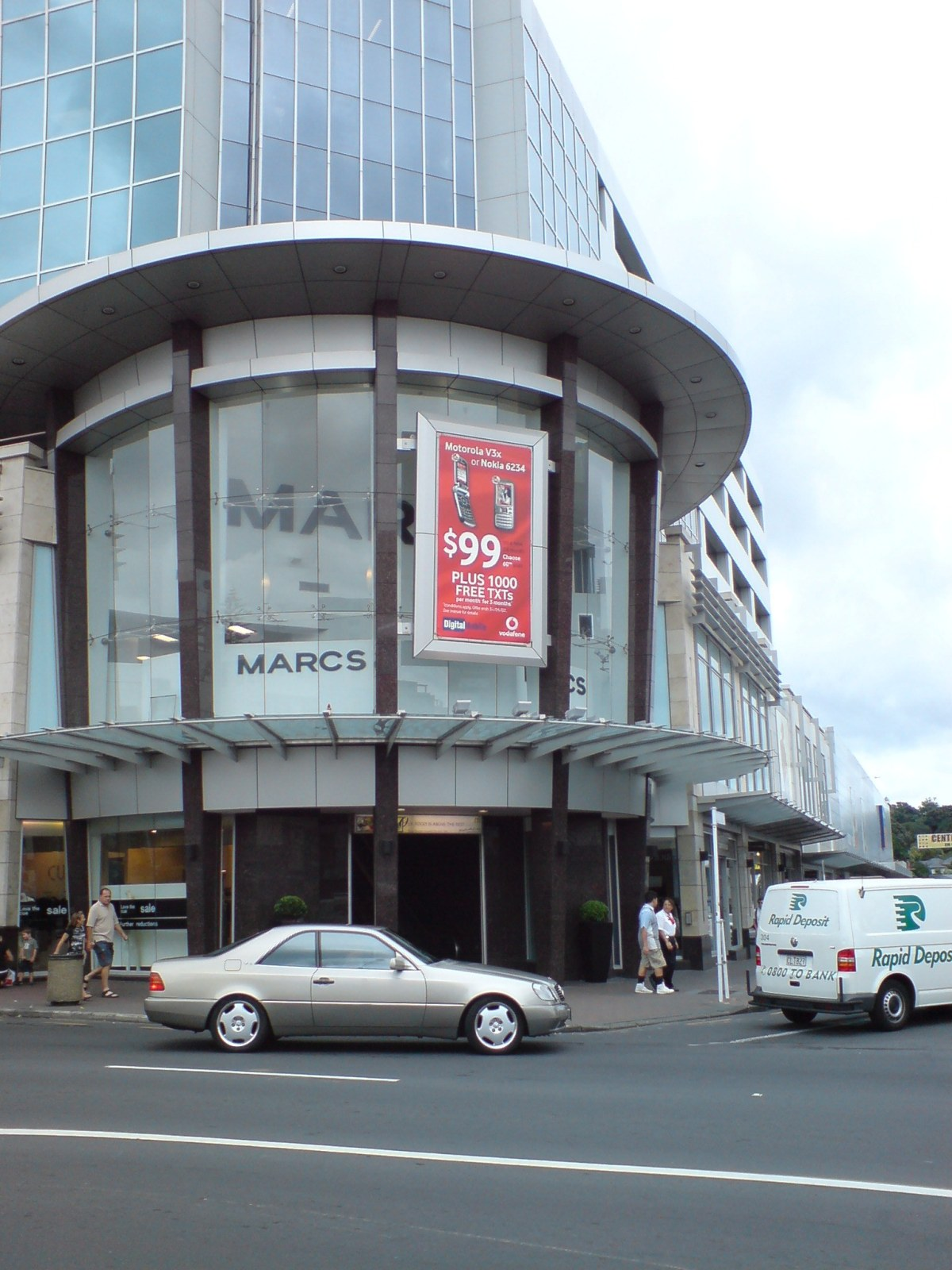
The Westfield 277 mall prior to refurbishment (2007)

Before refurbishment in 2018 and 2019, the centre featured a Countdown and about 60 specialty stores. In 2005, it had retail sales of NZ$120 million. It contained the New Zealand head offices of the Westfield Group. In a 2008 rating of New Zealand shopping centres by a retail expert group, Westfield Newmarket received three out of four stars, based on the criteria of amount of shopping area, economic performance, amenity and appeal as well as future growth prospects. Praised were its positions as one of the best-performing centres in the country, though the reviewers noted that parking could be "a nightmare".

=== Refurbishment and expansion ===
In 2009, it became public that Westfield intended to construct a $250 million new shopping centre on the southern side of Mortimer Pass. This centre would be linked to the existing 277 Broadway mall site by a two-level airbridge over Mortimer Pass.

In February 2018, the centre closed for a major extension project. The re-opening of the centre commenced in August 2019, with a first stage of 40 stores, the rest opening by the end of 2019. An air bridge over Mortimer Pass between the 309 and 277 Broadway buildings was opened in October 2019. In November 2019, the centre was criticised for deceptive and misleading parking practices.

The extension roughly double the size of the centre, and quadrupled the number of retailers. The 200 shop expansion at 309 Broadway had been planned for some time, and a general expansion of the 277 Broadway site had been prepared for even before Westfield acquired the centre from Auckland One, who demolished a 1980s office tower building to make way for the expansion. The work was however allegedly delayed because of reluctance by the Village SKYCITY Cinemas chain to move into the new centre from its existing location further north.

The redeveloped and refurbished $790 million mall will eventually contain 230 shops and 2,800 car parks. It was scheduled to open in phases, with the first stage opening between July and September 2019.

In November 2026, after entering administration, Australian department store David Jones announced that their store in the centre (the last remaining David Jones store in New Zealand after their acquisition of the former Kirkcaldie & Stains department store in Wellington) would close after the 2026 holiday season alongside 18 other stores in Australia.

== See also ==
- List of shopping centres in New Zealand
