= Star Boating Club =

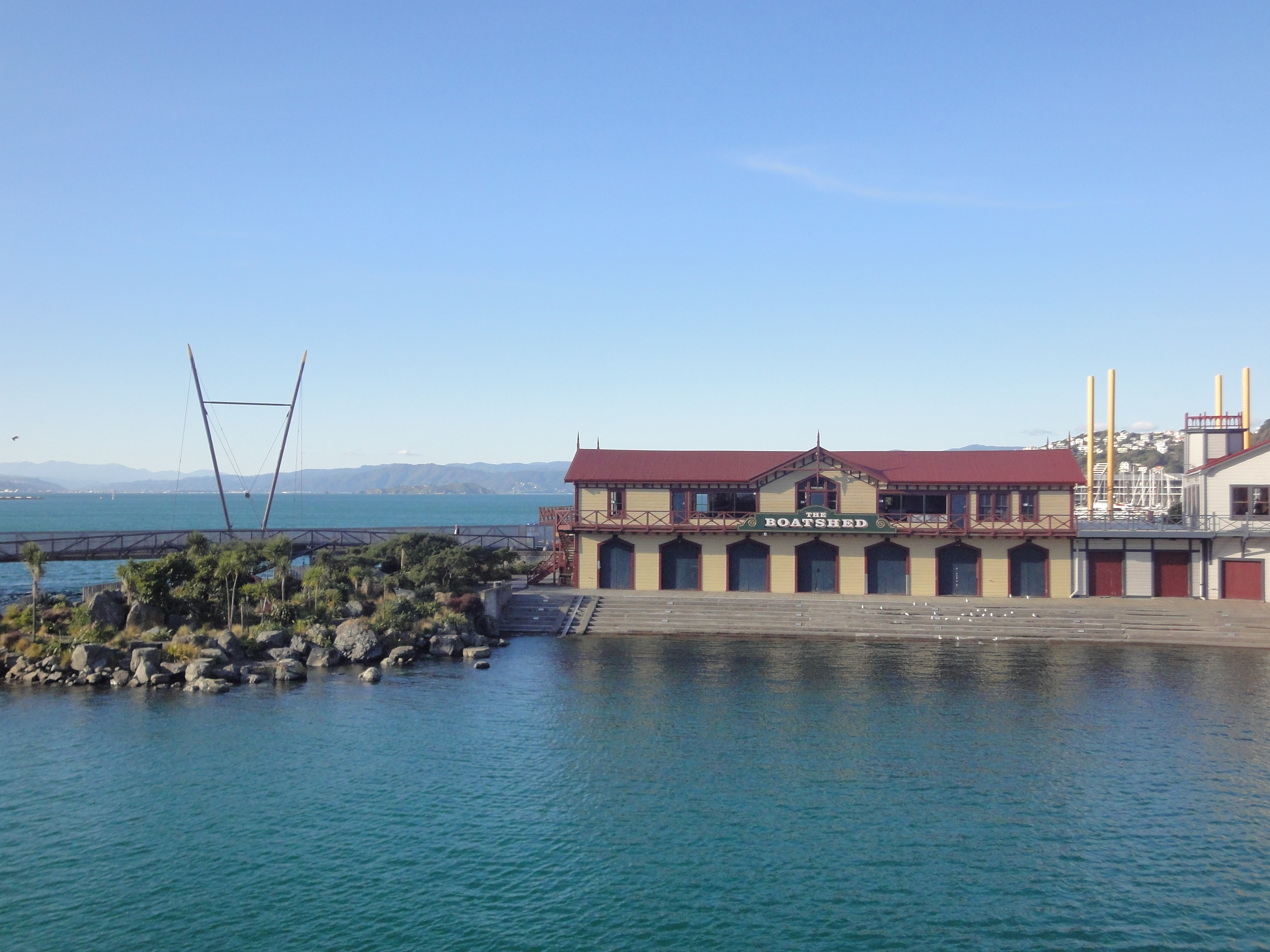
- Motto: Semper Refulgens
- Location: Wellington, New Zealand
- Coordinates: 41.2886°S 174.7797°E
- Home water: Wellington Harbour
- Founded: 1866
- Membership: 200 (approx.)
- Affiliations: WRA, RNZ
- Website: starboatingclub.com

Events
- Mothes Shield; Redding Shield; Norton Cup; Queens Cup; Xmas Regatta; Cambridge Town Cup; North Island Club Championships; National Club Championships

Notable members
- Lord Bernard Freyberg; George Cooke; John Gibbons; Louise Trappitt; Ruby Tew; George Bridgewater; Peter Taylor; Jackie Kiddle

Star Boating Club
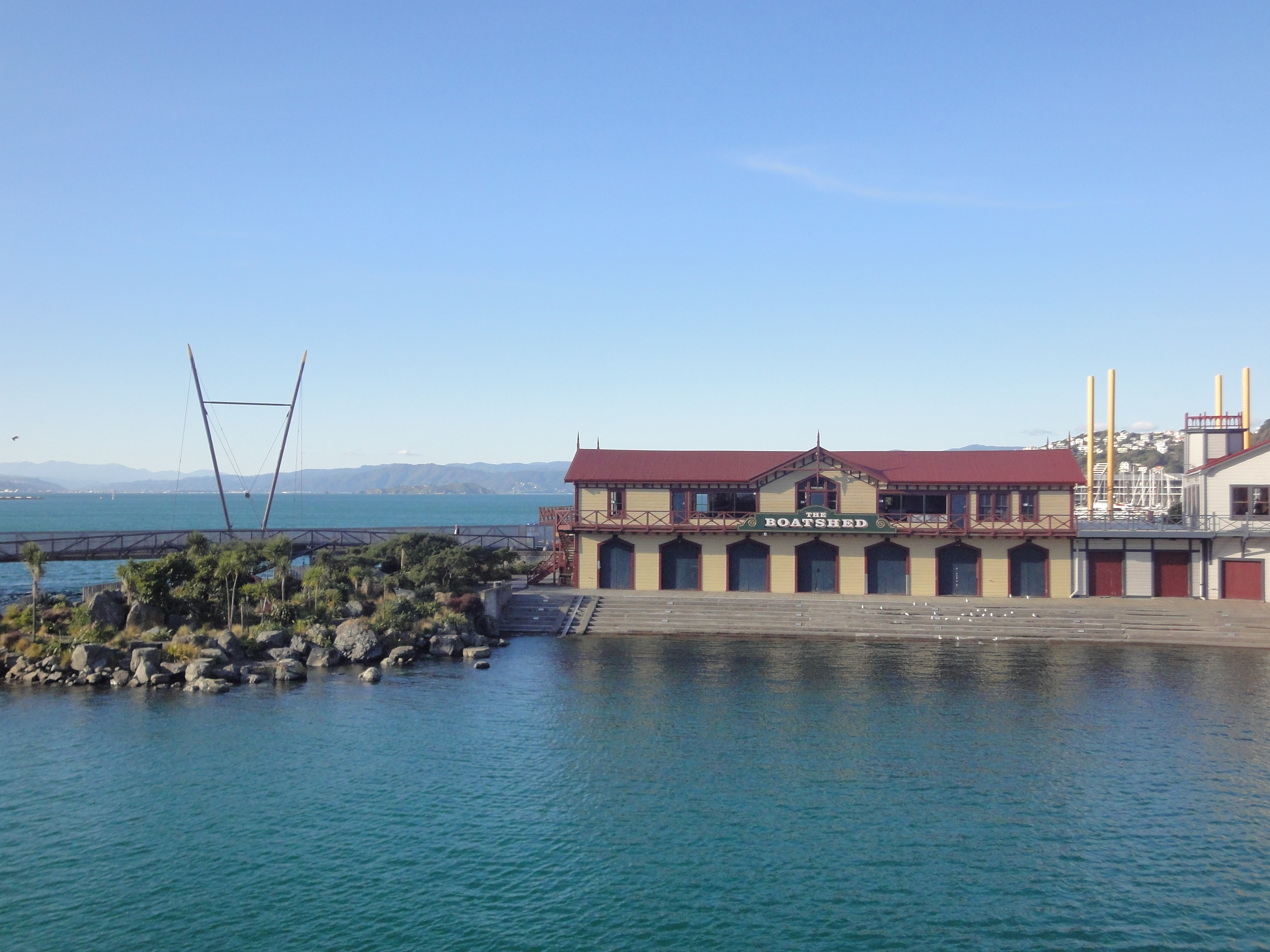
- Star Boating Club
- Interactive map of the Star Boating Club area

General information
- Type: Rowing club
- Architectural style: Victorian
- Location: Wellington, New Zealand
- Current tenants: Rowing Club
- Completed: 1886

Design and construction
- Architect: William Chatfield

Website
- www.starboatingclub.com

Heritage New Zealand – Category 1
- Designated: 26 June 2009
- Reference no.: 1431

Star Boating Club is a Wellington based rowing club, situated on the waterfront adjacent to Whairepo Lagoon. It is the oldest rowing club in Wellington, having existed since 1866. Star is one of New Zealand's oldest active rowing clubs and sporting organisations. It is home to rowers of all ages.

Its club building is classified as a Category 1 Historic Place (places of "special or outstanding historical or cultural heritage significance or value") by Heritage New Zealand.

== History ==
Star Boating Club was conceived in 1866, when a meeting was called to discuss "formation of a Wellington Regatta Club". The club was formalised as the "Star Regatta Club" in 1867, with four boats. The name was changed shortly afterwards to Star Boating Club. In 1881, Star and Union Rowing Club Christchurch first instituted 'club rowing races' as they are known today. By 1903, Star's membership had blossomed to over 400 people.

The club went through darker times during the Great Depression, and 150 and 117 Star members shipped out to serve in World War I and II, respectively. So many members served in WWII that a 'Star Platoon' was attached to the Wellington Regiment's 'B Company'.

Star members at the time included George Cooke (the club's top oarsman in the 1920s and 30s who was killed in action in WWII) and Lord Freyberg (of Freyberg Pool fame, former Governor General and Victoria Cross recipient). Indeed, the 50th anniversary of the club itself was postponed ten years because of the advent of WWII.

The club celebrated its 150-year anniversary in 2016. It maintains a strong membership of Wellingtonians who still deem it an honour to wear the blue and white colours.

== Building ==
Star Boating Club has had three club houses. Over the years, the expansion of Wellington City and the development of its shoreline necessitated the Club to move four times. The first two club houses were sheds. The first shed was near the site of the Wellington Cenotaph. In 1874 the club moved to its second shed next to Plimmer's Wharf on Victoria Street. By 1883 the club needed to move again and it was at this point that the current building for the club was built. It was designed by club member and architect William Chatfield. The building was built on sleepers so that as more reclamation took place, it could be moved closer to the shore. It was officially opened on 7 June 1886 and shifted on rails, towed by a steam engine, in 1889.

=== Renovation and refurbishment ===
As part of the redevelopment of Wellington's waterfront in 1989 the building was relocated to its current site. At this time it was also extensively refurbished. Following the 2011 Christchurch earthquake, the clubhouse was earthquake-strengthened.

=== Downstage Theatre and civic venue ===
Between 1969 and 1973 Downstage Theatre occupied the clubrooms while the rowing club continued to operate from the ground floor. The building has also been used for major events in Wellington, including the 1992 Fringe Festival, the 1993 Gay and Lesbian Devotion Festival, and the International Festival of the Arts in 1994 and 1996.

== Notable members ==
- George Bridgewater
- George Cooke
- Lord Bernard Freyberg
- John Gibbons
- Peter Taylor
- Ruby Tew
- Louise Trappitt

== Membership ==
Star Boating Club caters for all levels of rowing from juniors to masters and has produced many successful national and international rowers.

=== Affiliated schools ===
- Queen Margaret College
- Rongotai College
- Scots College
- Wellington East Girls' College
- Wellington College
- Wellington Girls' College
- Wellington High School
