= Prouds =

Australian jewellery store chain

Prouds the Jewellers
- Industry: Retail
- Founded: 1903; 123 years ago
- Founder: William James Proud
- Headquarters: Pitt Street, Sydney, Australia
- Area served: Sydney; Brisbane; Melbourne; Perth
- Key people: William James Proud
- Products: Jewellery
- Revenue: A$600 million (2012)
- Parent: James Pascoe Group
- Website: prouds.com.au

Prouds the Jewellers (commonly referred to as Prouds) is an Australian jewellery business founded by William James Proud on Pitt Street, Sydney in 1903.

== History ==
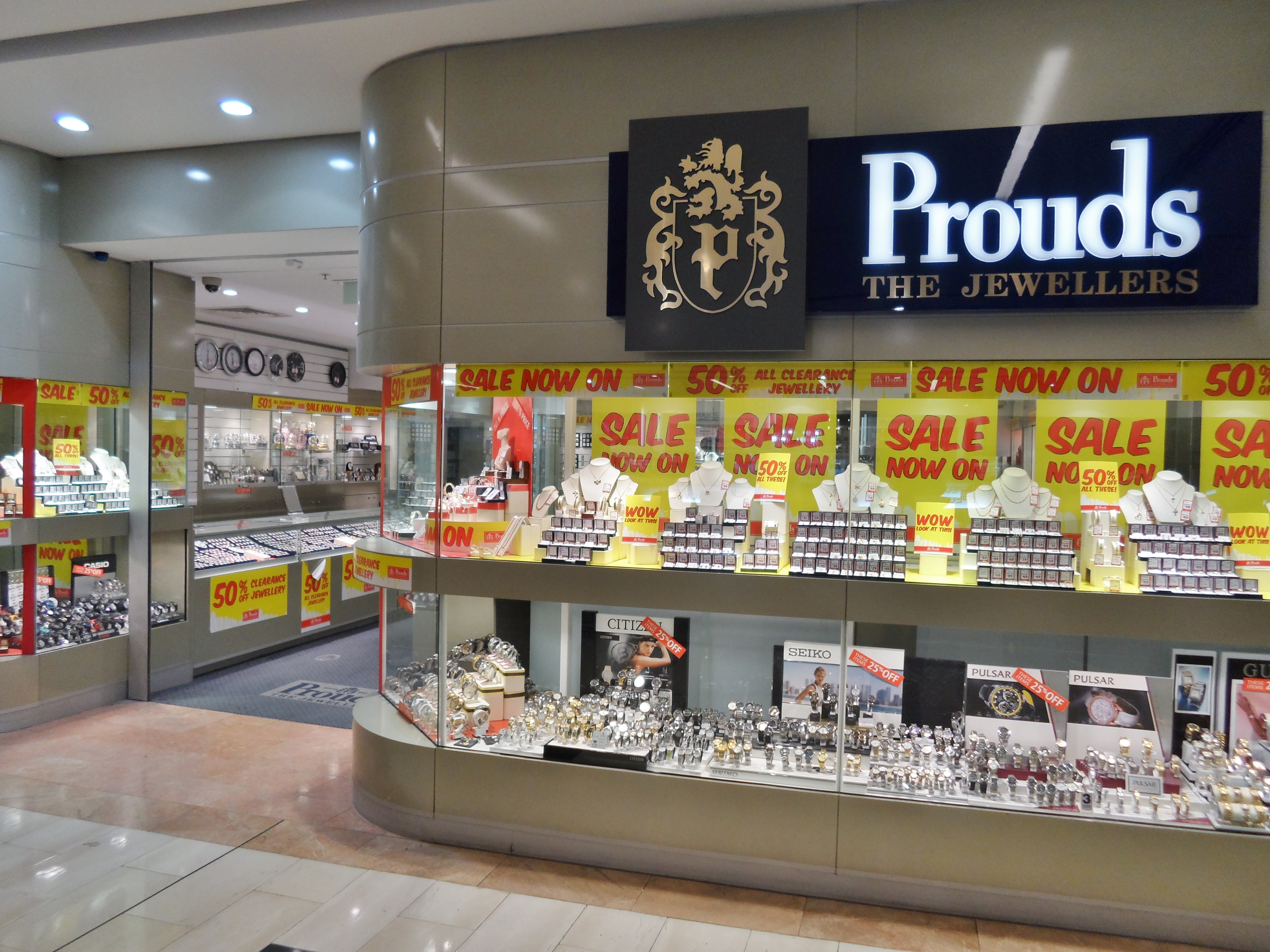
Prouds in Westfield Sydney

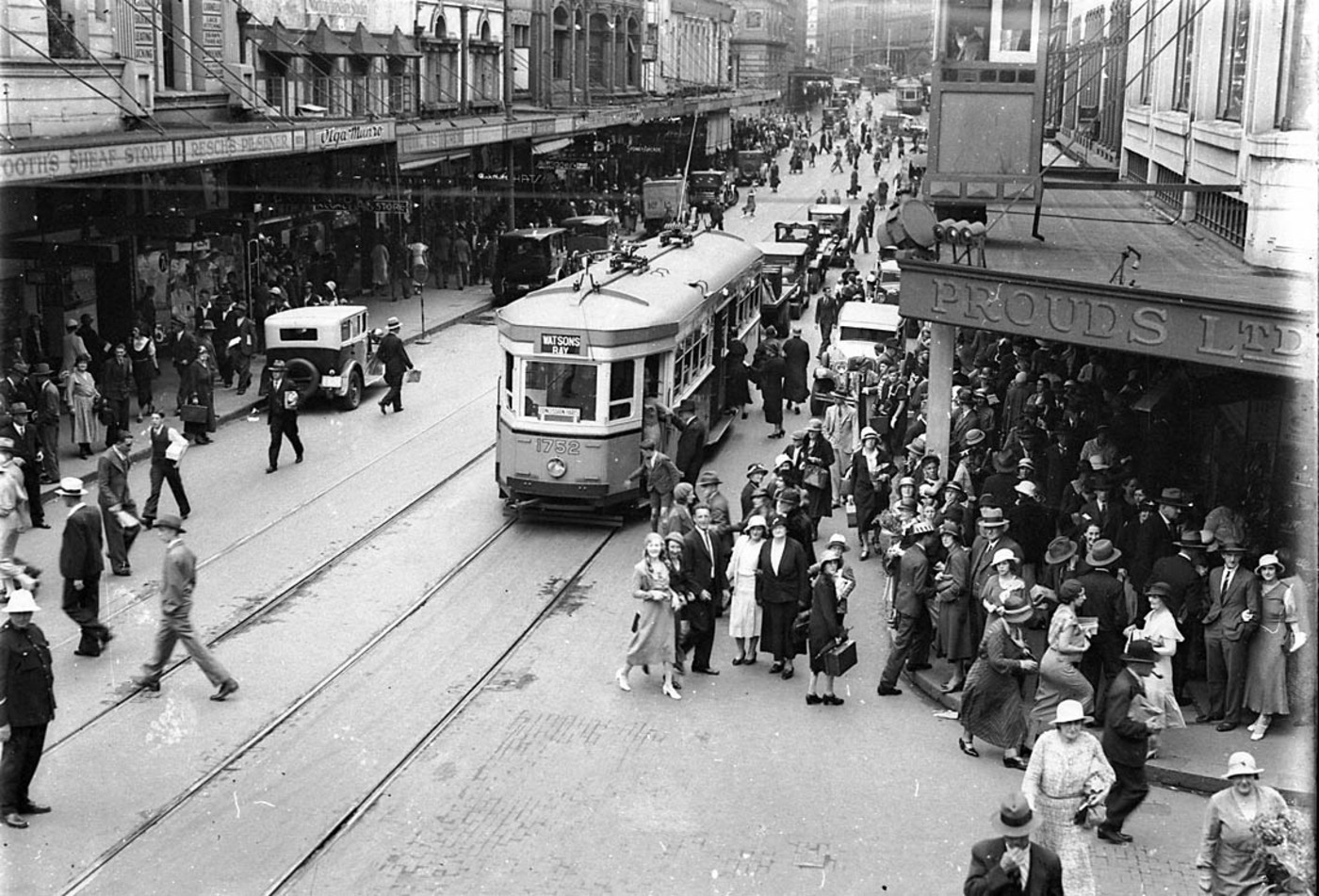
Street view of Prouds, corner of King and Pitt Streets, ca. 1934

Prouds was founded in 1903 by clock and watchmaker William James "Bill" Proud (1871–1931). In 1971 Hooker Corporation acquired Prouds' 72 stores and subsequently the business was sold to Goldmark Jewellers.

In 1996 Pascoes purchased the then 93-year-old Australian jeweller, saving it from administration. In 1996, Prouds had 67 stores. This increased to over 195 in 2013. After the acquisition of Farmers, Prouds jewellery kiosks were included in some Farmers stores across New Zealand as store-within-a-store. However, after the purchase of Angus & Coote, it was replaced with Goldmark, and Prouds is no longer marketed in New Zealand.

In February 2008 Prouds lost a case against the Australian Competition & Consumer Commission over 'illusory' 'was/now' price advertising. The Federal Court of Australia found two of Prouds' catalogues, for Valentine's Day and Mother's Day 2006, breached the Trade Practices Act 1974.

Prouds reported annual income of NZ$707.6 million in 2008–2009. In 2012 Prouds was reported as being the largest retailer by market share in Australia's estimated A$3.8 billion jewellery industry. The same report estimated Prouds revenue as A$600 million.
