= James Pascoe Group =

New Zealand retail company (1906)

James Pascoe Group (JPG)
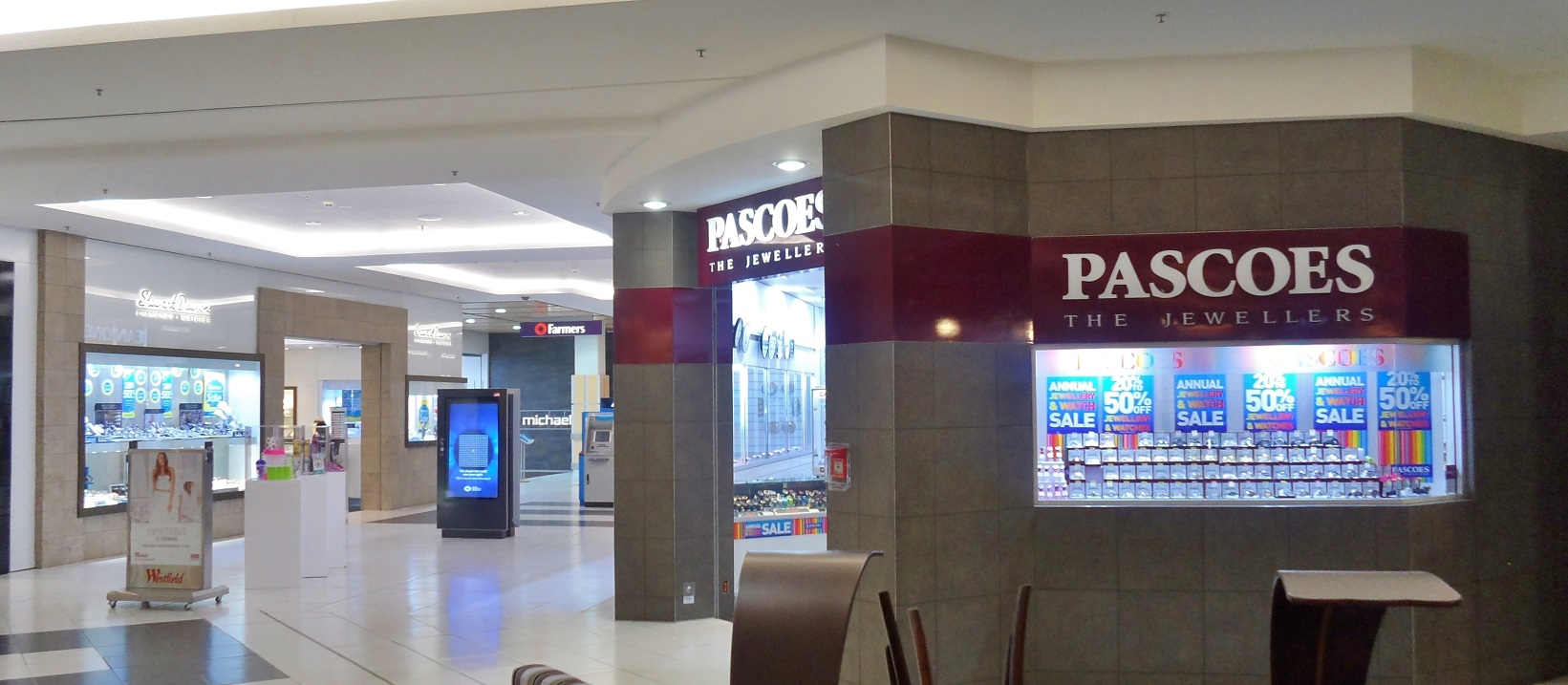
- Stewart Dawsons, Farmers, and Pascoes at Queensgate Shopping Centre
- Type: Private
- Industry: Retail
- Founded: 1906; 120 years ago
- Founder: James Pascoe
- Headquarters: 29 Union Street, Auckland, New Zealand
- Number of locations: over 650
- Area served: New Zealand, Australia
- Key people: David Norman (Group managing director); Anne Norman; Kevin Turner (Group General Manage Finance)
- Products: Jewellery, watches, apparel, cosmetics, household goods, books, stationery
- Revenue: $2 billion
- Owner: Anne & David Norman and Family
- Number of employees: 11000+
- Divisions: Pascoes; Prouds The Jewellers; Farmers; Stevens; Whitcoulls

The James Pascoe Ltd Group of Companies is a privately owned New Zealand retail group with holdings across New Zealand and Australia. In New Zealand the group owns and operates jewellery chains Pascoes the Jewellers, Stewart Dawsons and Goldmark; department store Farmers; homeware retailer Stevens; and bookshop Whitcoulls. The group's three Australian businesses are jewellers Prouds the Jewellers, Angus & Coote and Goldmark, with over 460 stores across Australia as of 2012. Goldmark is the only brand operating in both countries.

== History ==
The company traces its origins to a small jewellery shop founded by James Pascoe in Auckland in 1906. The business has been under the direction of his granddaughter, Anne Norman and her husband David since the 1980s. Under their control, the original family jeweller has turned into a 'retail empire' encompassing eight New Zealand and Australian retailers. The Group specialises in turning around loss-making retailers, and has never sold a business. Today James Pascoe Group is one of New Zealand's largest businesses and employers.

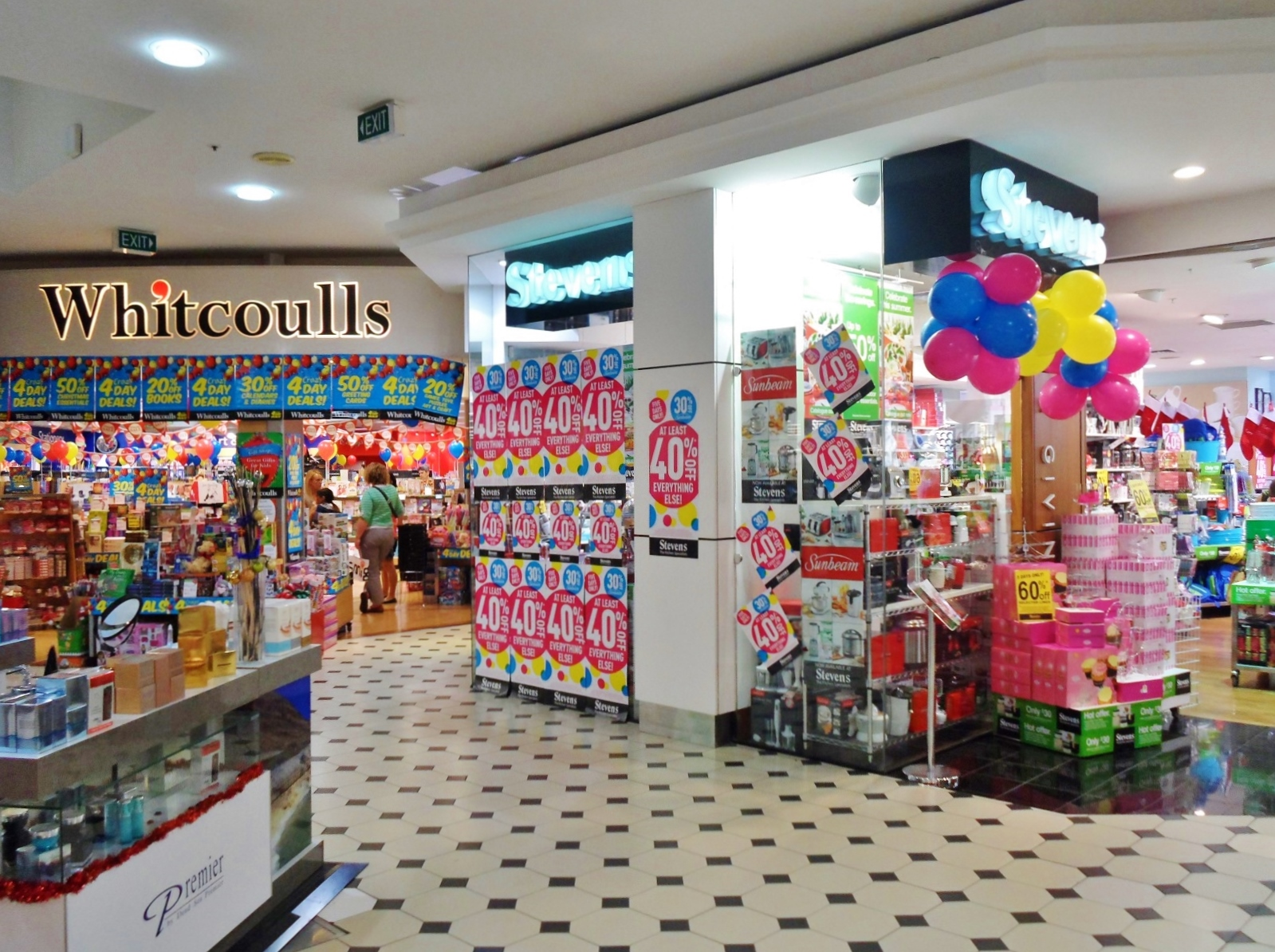
Whitcoulls Newmarket and Stevens Two Double Seven

== Size ==
The James Pascoe Group is larger than The Warehouse Group. With its five jewellery retailers and hundreds of stores, JPG has a large share of Australasian jewellery sales (generating revenue of $750 million in Australia alone in 2010) and is a global jewellery buying power. At the time of the acquisition of Angus & Coote, David Norman commented "To us it makes sense to harness the economy of scale when it comes to sourcing, and marketing" Rivals of the James Pascoe Group include Michael Hill International (although JPG is over four times its size), and Showcase Jewellers (with almost 250 stores in Australia, and around 30 in New Zealand)

Acquiring Whitcoulls made JPG the biggest tenant of New Zealand's then-12 Westfield shopping centres.

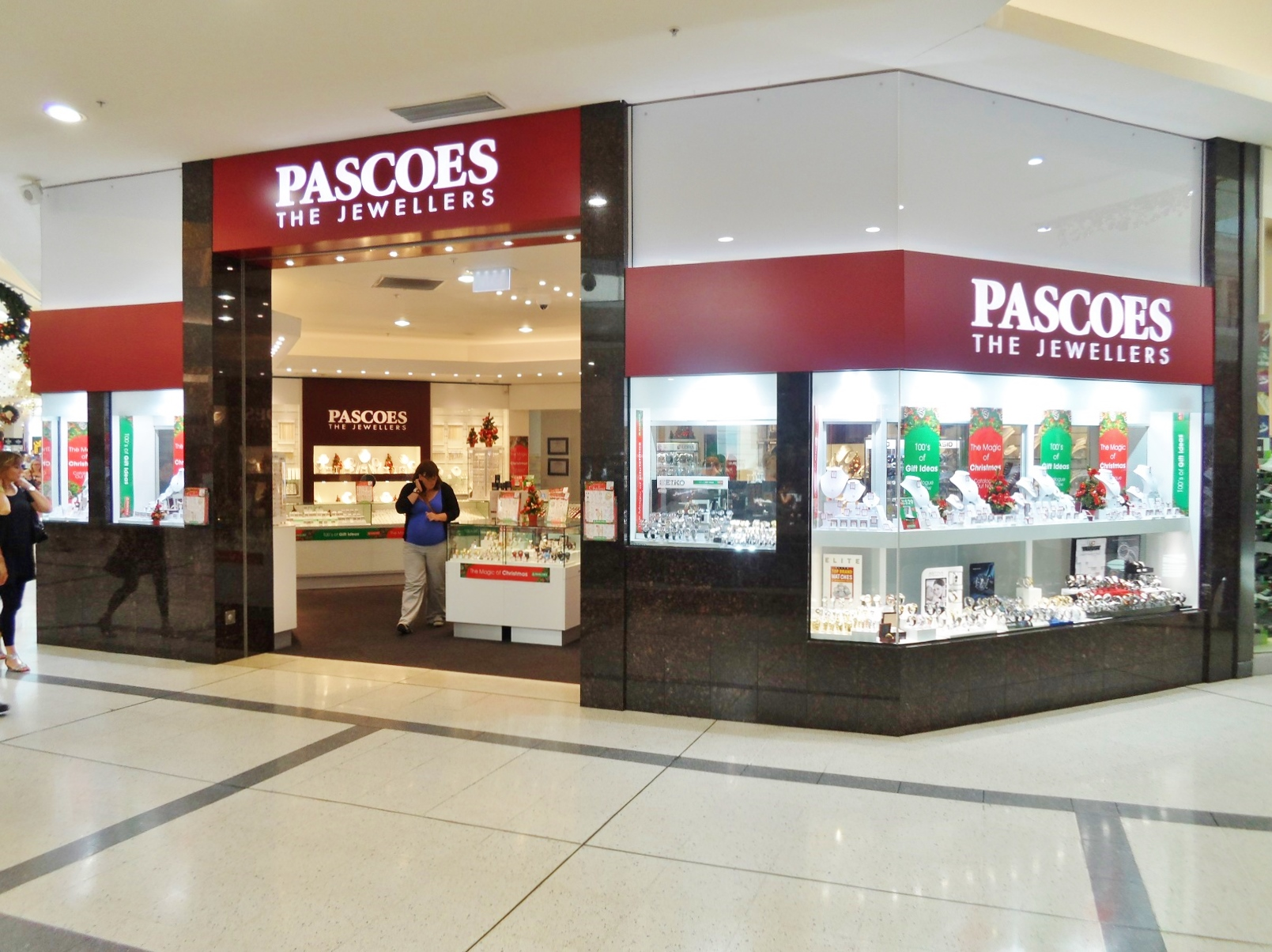
Pascoes Riccarton

== Companies ==
=== Pascoes the Jewellers ===
Pascoes the Jewellers was founded by James Pascoe at Three Lamps in Ponsonby, Auckland in 1906. The company was incorporated in 1937. (Not to be confused with independent Queensland, Australia retailer Pascoe Jewellers.)

After the death of James Pascoe in 1966, the business was managed by a trust until Anne and David Norman took control in 1980. While some growth throughout the North Island took place under the trust, it wasn't until Norman control that the group started expanding into the rest of the country. As of 2022 there are 40 Pascoes the Jewellers stores across New Zealand, offering the country's 'largest range of jewellery and watches'. Pascoes is JPG's mid-range jeweller in New Zealand. The main rival of Pascoes the Jewellers in New Zealand is Michael Hill Jeweller.

=== Stewart Dawsons ===
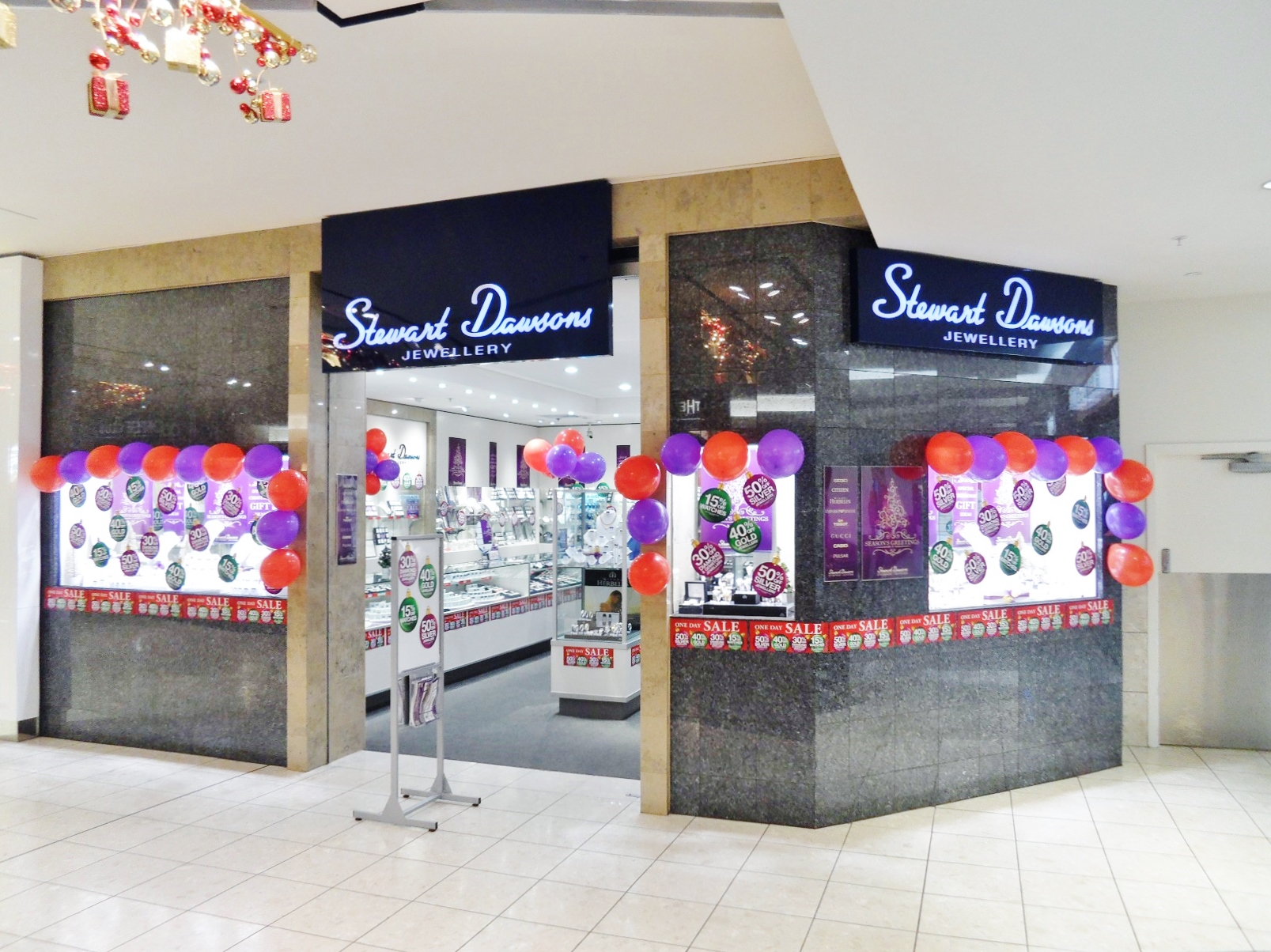
Stewart Dawsons Hamilton

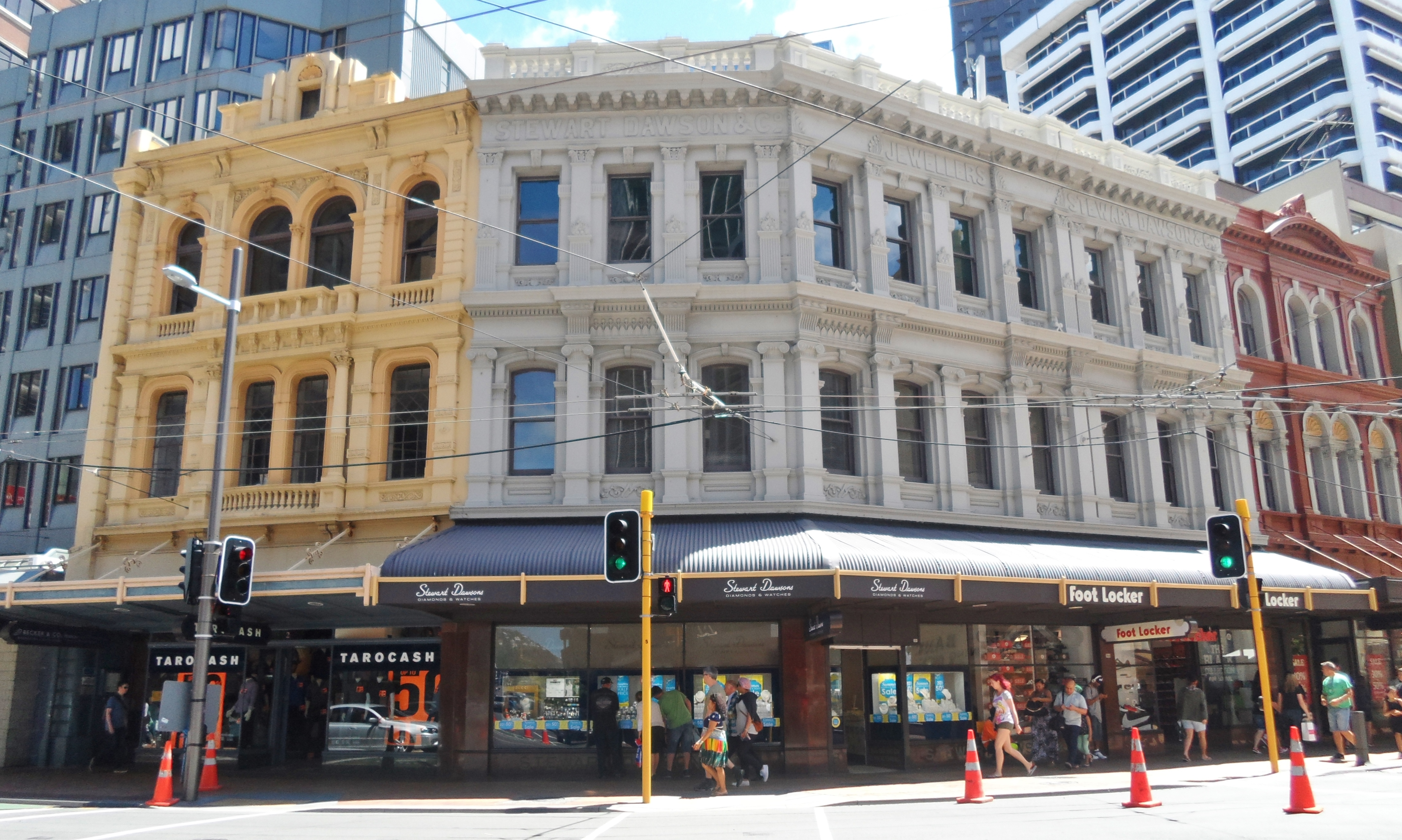
Stewart Dawsons Lambton Quay in the Stewart Dawson's Building

Stewart Dawsons was founded in Liverpool, England in 1871 by 22-year-old Scotsman David Stewart Dawson. Initially a jewellery manufacturer, Dawson opened his first retail shop Stewart Dawson of Liverpool in 1876. Due to the success of his products in Australia, Dawson immigrated to Sydney in 1886 and founded Stewart Dawsons & Co. After opening shops in Sydney, followed by Melbourne, then Auckland in 1885 and Dunedin in 1886, and on Regent Street in London, locations were added in Wellington and Christchurch. The Wellington shop on the corner of Lambton Quay and Willis Street is a New Zealand Historic Places Trust "Category II listed" building, built for Dawson in 1901. The building is known locally as Stewart Dawsons Corner.

After making the company a limited liability company in 1907, Dawson sold it in 1931 to RHO Hills department store (now House of Fraser). The resulting company operated until 'around 1935'. Dawson died in 1932. Stewart Dawsons was purchased by Anne and David Norman in 1985. Today the company acts as JPG's upmarket New Zealand diamond, jewellery and watch retailer, with 15 stores across the country.

=== Prouds ===
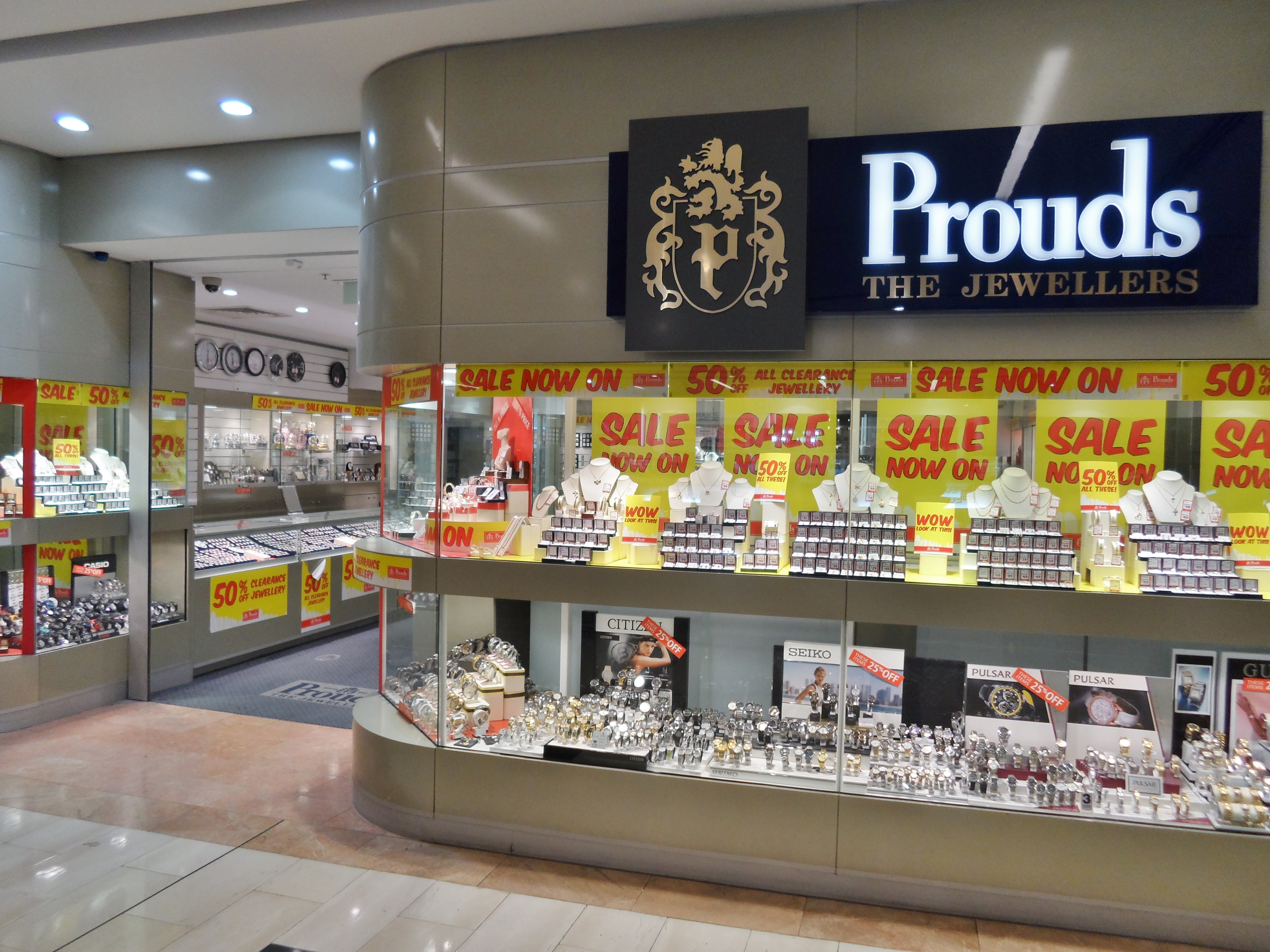
Prouds Westfield Sydney

Prouds was founded by William James Prouds on Pitt Street, Sydney in 1903. In 1996 Pascoes purchased the then-93-year-old Australian jeweller, saving it from administration. At the time Prouds had 67 stores, increased to 160 by 2007, and to over 195–200 in 2013. After the acquisition of Farmers, Prouds jewellery kiosks were included in select Farmers stores across New Zealand as store-within-a-store. However, after the purchase of Angus & Coote, it was replaced with Goldmark, and Prouds is no longer marketed in New Zealand.

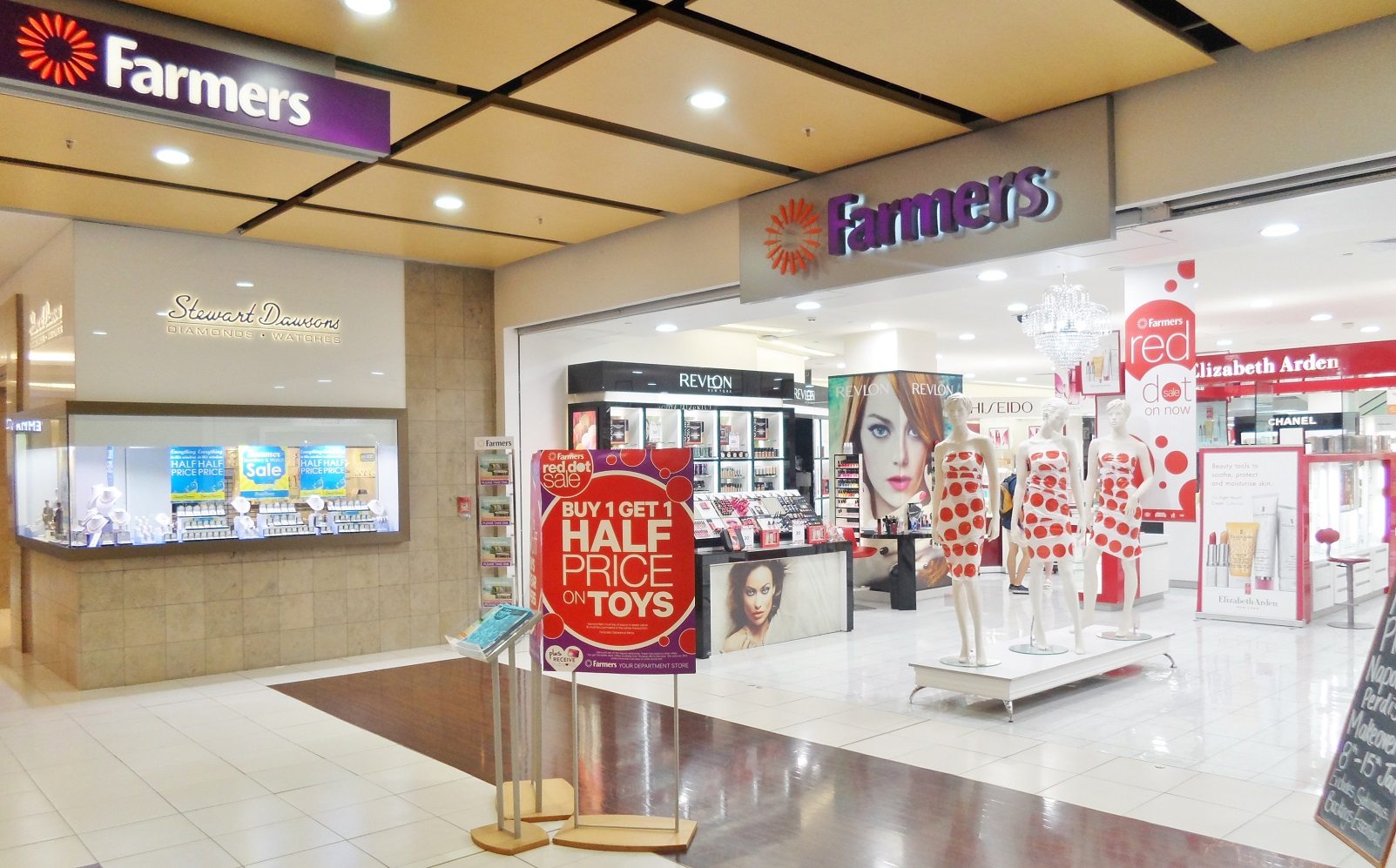
Stewart Dawsons Queensgate and Farmers Queensgate

In 2012 Prouds was reported as being the largest retailer by market share in Australia's estimated AU$3.8 billion jewellery industry. The same report estimated Prouds revenue as AU$600 million. Prouds reported annual income of NZ$707.6 million in 2008–2009. As of 2020, Prouds remains the largest jewellery retail chain in Australia.

=== Farmers ===
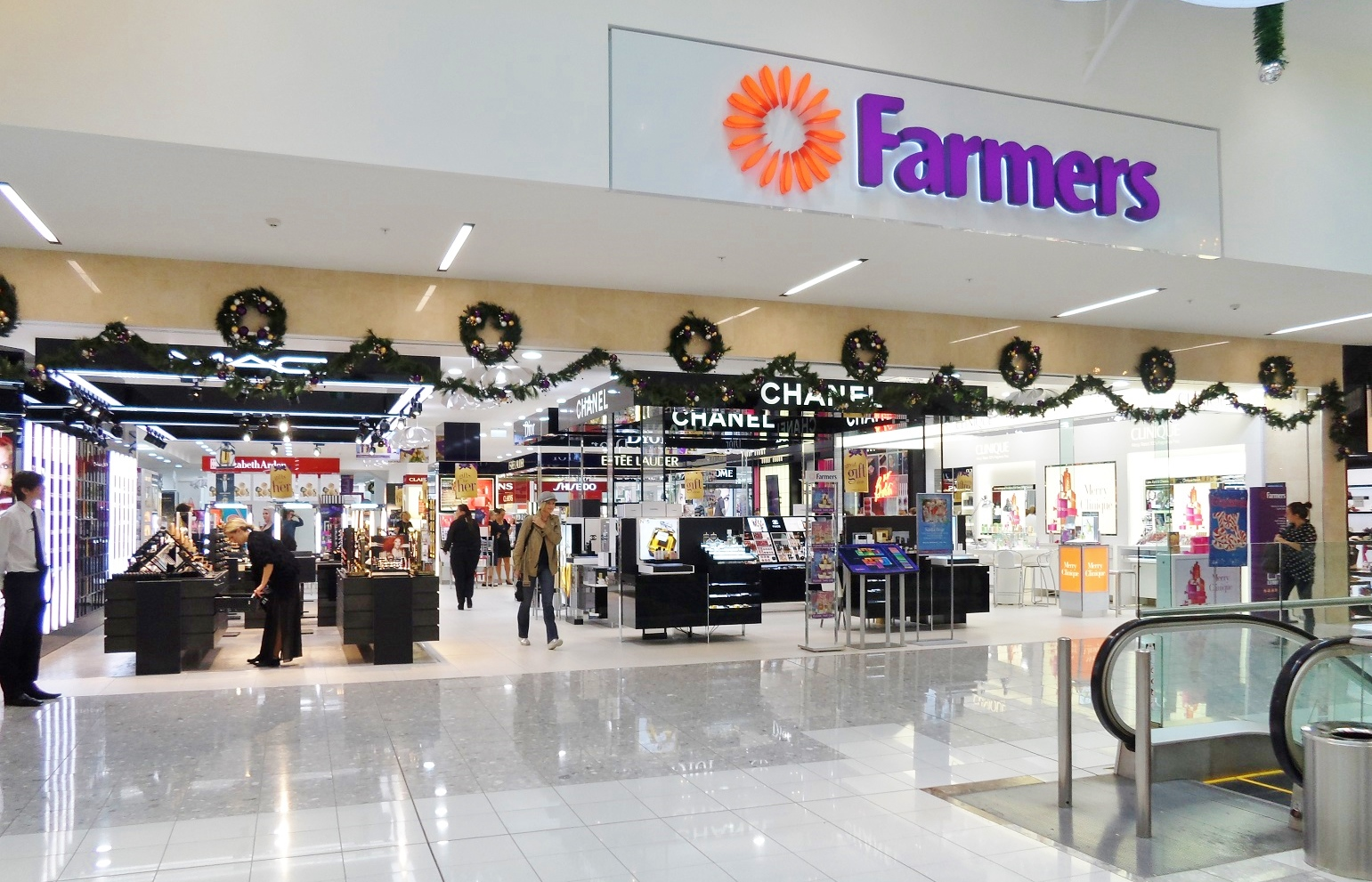
Farmers Centre Place

Farmers Trading Company was founded by Robert Laidlaw in 1909 as mail order business Laidlaw Leeds. In 1918 the company amalgamated with Auckland farming services cooperative The Farmers Union Trading Company, adopting its current name. After taking over South Island chain Calder Mackay in 1970, Farmers became the country's largest department store chain. In 1986 Chase Corporation purchased the company, but due to the share market crash less than a year later, Chase collapsed in 1989.

In 1992 Farmers was purchased by DEKA, the Maori Development Corporation and Foodlands Associated Ltd (FAL), which in 1993 took a controlling interest in the then-Farmers-DEKA Group. In 1999 the Beauty Club loyalty programme was launched. In 2001 with the collapse of DEKA, 13 stores were converted to Farmers, and the company rebranded to its current logo.

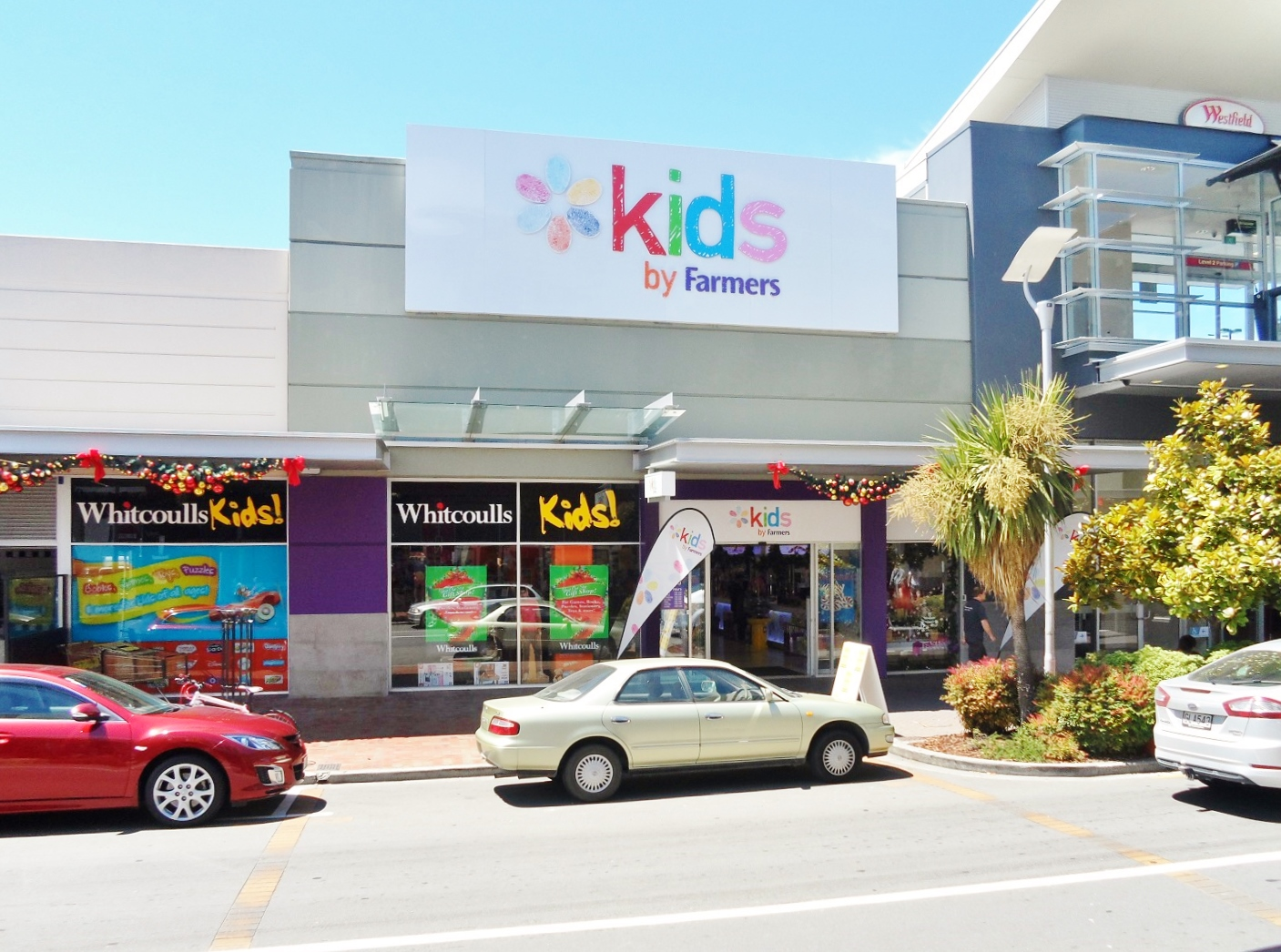
Former Kids by Farmers Riccarton with Whitcoulls Kids Riccarton

In 2003 Farmers became James Pascoe Group's largest purchase yet, the retail arm bought for $122.3 million from Foodlands. The total sale was $311 million, with Fisher & Paykel paying $188.7 million for the Farmers finance and credit card business. Foodlands had been attempting to sell the loss-maker, but struggled to find a buyer for the 64-store chain as several interested parties found the $300 million-plus asking price too high. Fisher & Paykel merged their existing finance business with Farmers Finance to make a nationwide retail consumer finance company. At the time Farmers had over 500,000 customer accounts, including 350,000 with a Farmers store card. Fisher & Paykel Finance has an exclusive agreement to supply financial services to the retailer for 20 years, including exclusivity of the Farmers Finance Card. To this day Farmers holds exclusive Farmers Finance Cardholder shopping events.

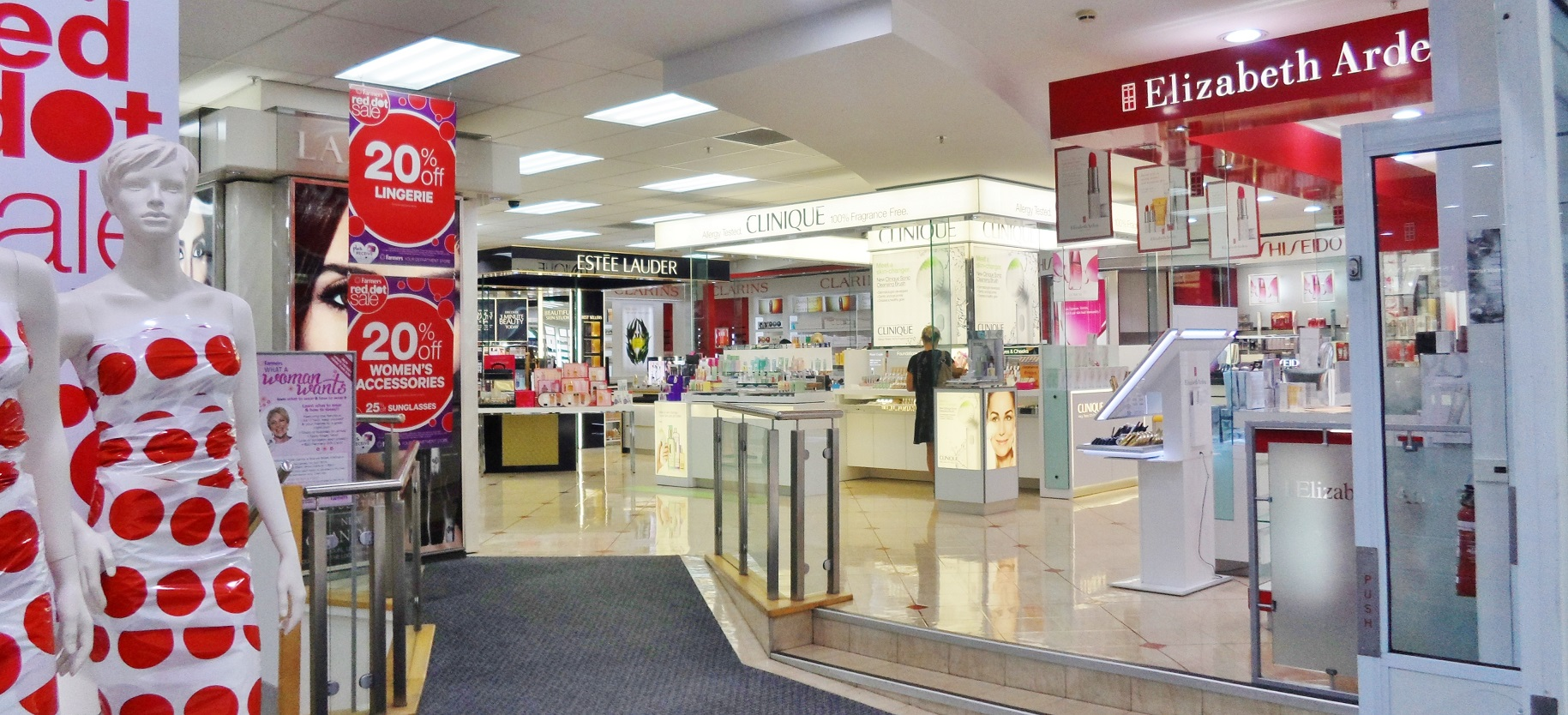
Cosmetics at Farmers Lambton Quay

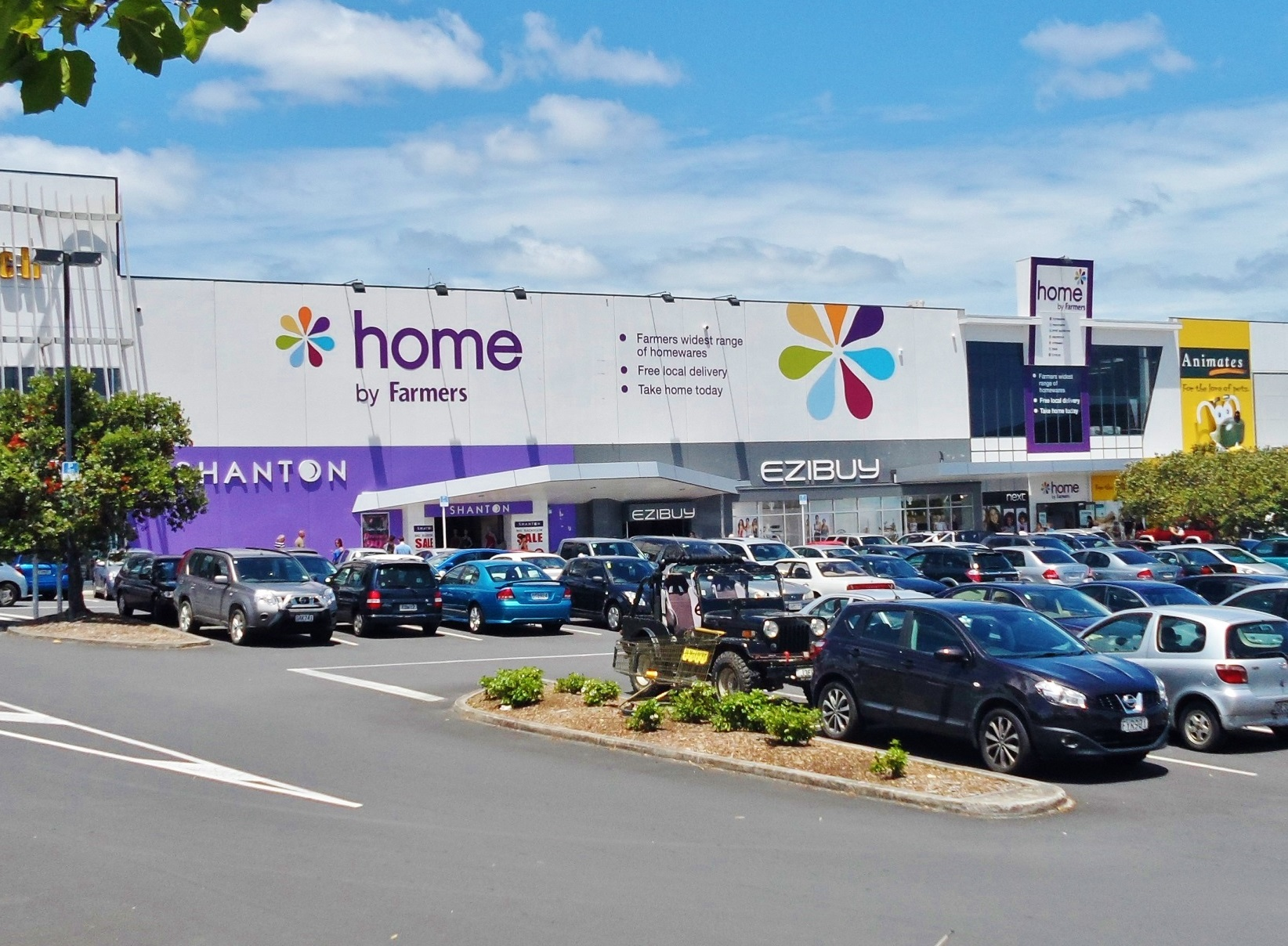
Home by Farmers Albany

David Norman was appointed CEO in 2004: "Believe it or not Farmers approached my wife and I regarding the possibility of operating Pascoe jewellery concessions within the department stores. When we took a closer look and saw the potential of the Farmers business it soon became clear we should return it to New Zealand ownership." He said the Normans felt "a deep sense of satisfaction that a New Zealand retailing icon is back where it should be, that is at the forefront of the NZ retailing industry". "When we changed the byline of Farmers to 'Your Store' we did so with the real intent of making Farmers relevant to its market. Our market surveys showed overwhelming support for the Farmers brand, its heritage, and a desire to see it succeed." The Normans have dismissed rumours of expanding Farmers into Australia to compete with the likes of Target and Myer.

Since taking ownership, categories such as hardware and computers have been abandoned for a focus on fashion and beauty. Many stores have been redeveloped or completely rebuilt. Attempts have been made to attract a younger customer, such as Switch and Substation youth clothing brands with dedicated concept areas, and changing Prouds-branded jewellery kiosks to Goldmark. As part of taking the company upmarket, many stores have been extensively updated, and a new flagship store opened at Westfield Albany in 2007.

As of 2022, Farmers major offerings include Women's Fashion, Men's Fashion, Lingerie, Serviced Cosmetics, Health & Beauty, Accessories, Children's, Kitchen and Tabletop, Small appliances, Manchester, and Furniture. Technology and Major appliances are sent to and displayed on the floor at selected stores but can be purchased at any store as the items are freighted from the Distribution Center in Auckland. 12 (formerly 13 in 2009) some stores include Goldmark kiosks, and 17 include Stevens stores. In August 2011, the Farmers Beauty Club became Farmers Club, extending the reward scheme to the whole store. Traditional Farmers Finance Cardholder nights have been supplemented with discount events and gifts exclusively for Farmers Club members.

=== Angus and Coote ===
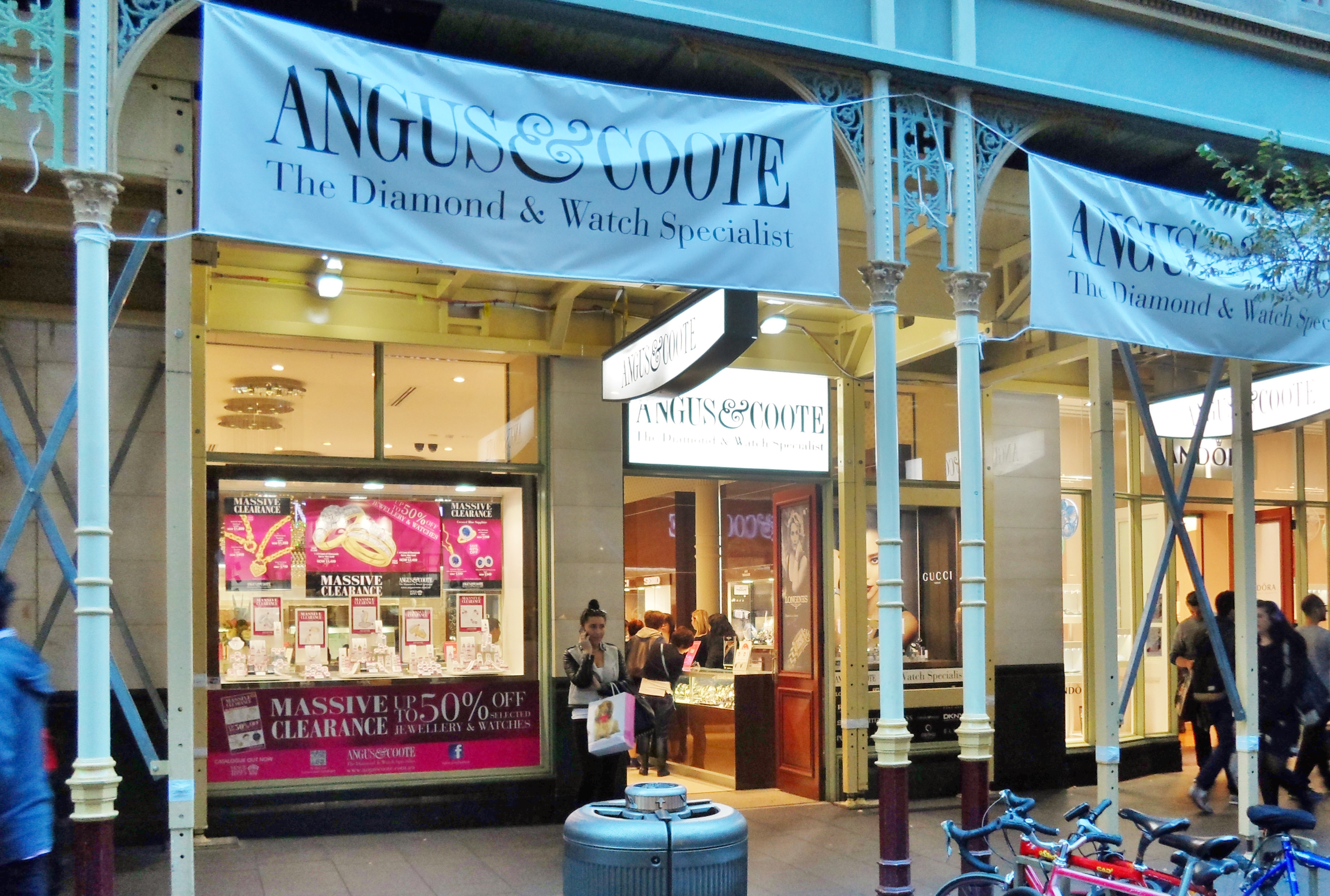
Angus & Coote Pitt Street Mall

Angus & Coote was founded in Sydney, Australia in 1895 and listed on the ASX in 1952. The retailer is a leader in Australia for high quality jewellery, with its 300 stores having a 20% market share as of early 2007.

In March 2007, JPG successfully completed a $A76m ($NZ87m) takeover bid of the loss-making family-owned jewellery group, including brands Amies in Queensland, Dunklings in Victoria and Edments in South Australia and Western Australia (all completely rebranded to Angus & Coote after November 2008) and Goldmark. The Goldmark and Edments brands were part of Prouds The Jewellers, with Angus & Coote acquiring them in 1996 when JPG purchased the main Prouds brand. At the time of the purchase, David Norman suggested one or more of newly acquired Angus & Coote brands could be launched in New Zealand. Goldmark is now included as a store-within-a-store at kiosks in selected Farmers stores.

=== Goldmark ===
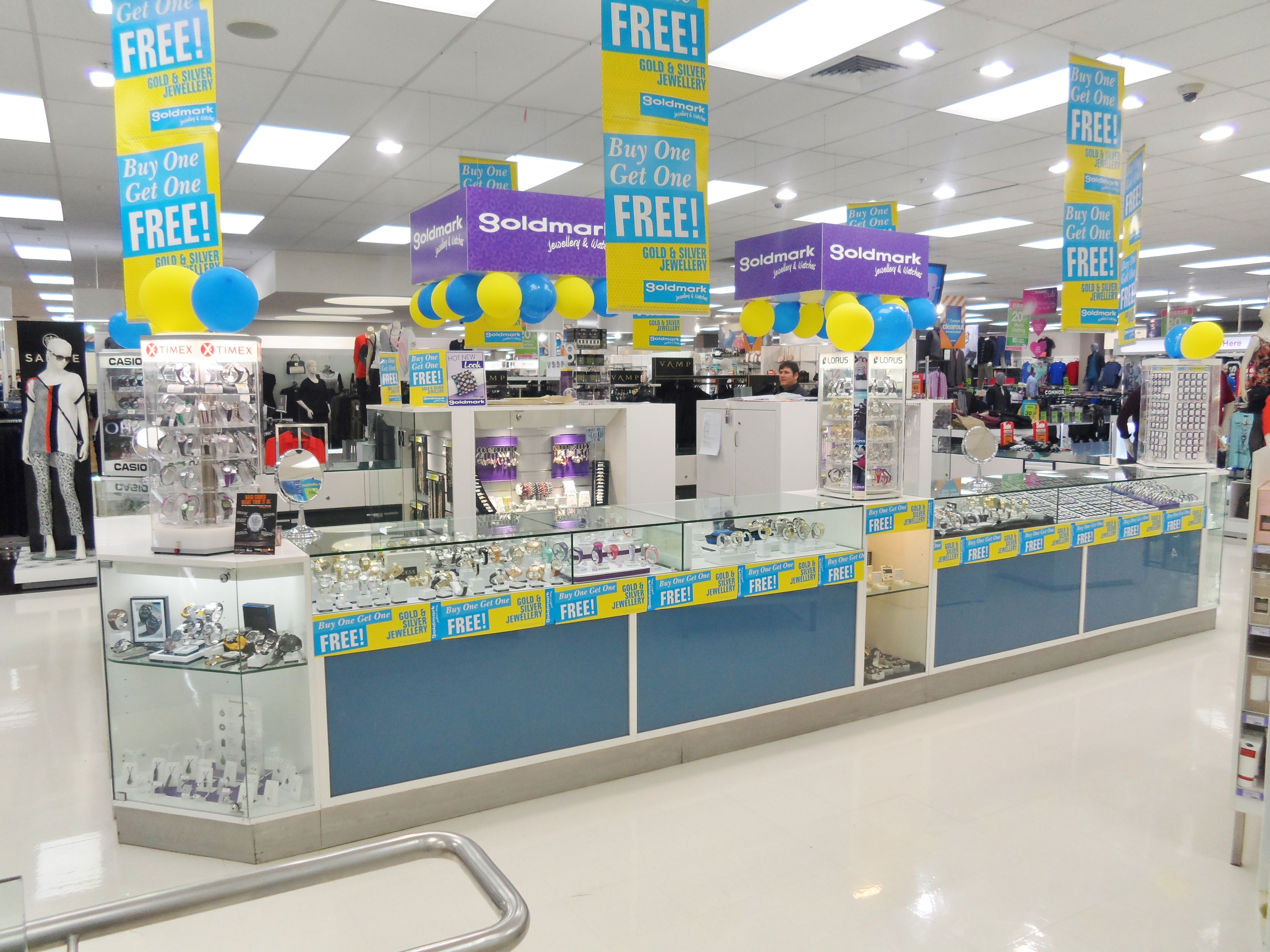
Goldmark within Farmers Dunedin

'One of the leading women's fashion jewellery retailers in Australia', Goldmark is a 'decades' old fashion jewellery retailer aimed at 16- to 29-year-olds. It was one of the brands included with the Angus & Coote purchase in March 2007. The current logo was introduced in 2000, and many stores have been updated to a modern look. Goldmark has over 130 stores across Australia, with over 1,000 employees throughout Australia and New Zealand. Goldmark positions itself as "the fashionable, REAL jewellery store", offering jewellery made of authentic precious metals containing genuine precious stones, as well as fashion brand watches. Before JPG ownership, in January 2003, Goldmark launched the gClub loyalty programme. In June 2009 the gClub card was introduced. Membership of the Online VIP gClub exceeds 90,000.

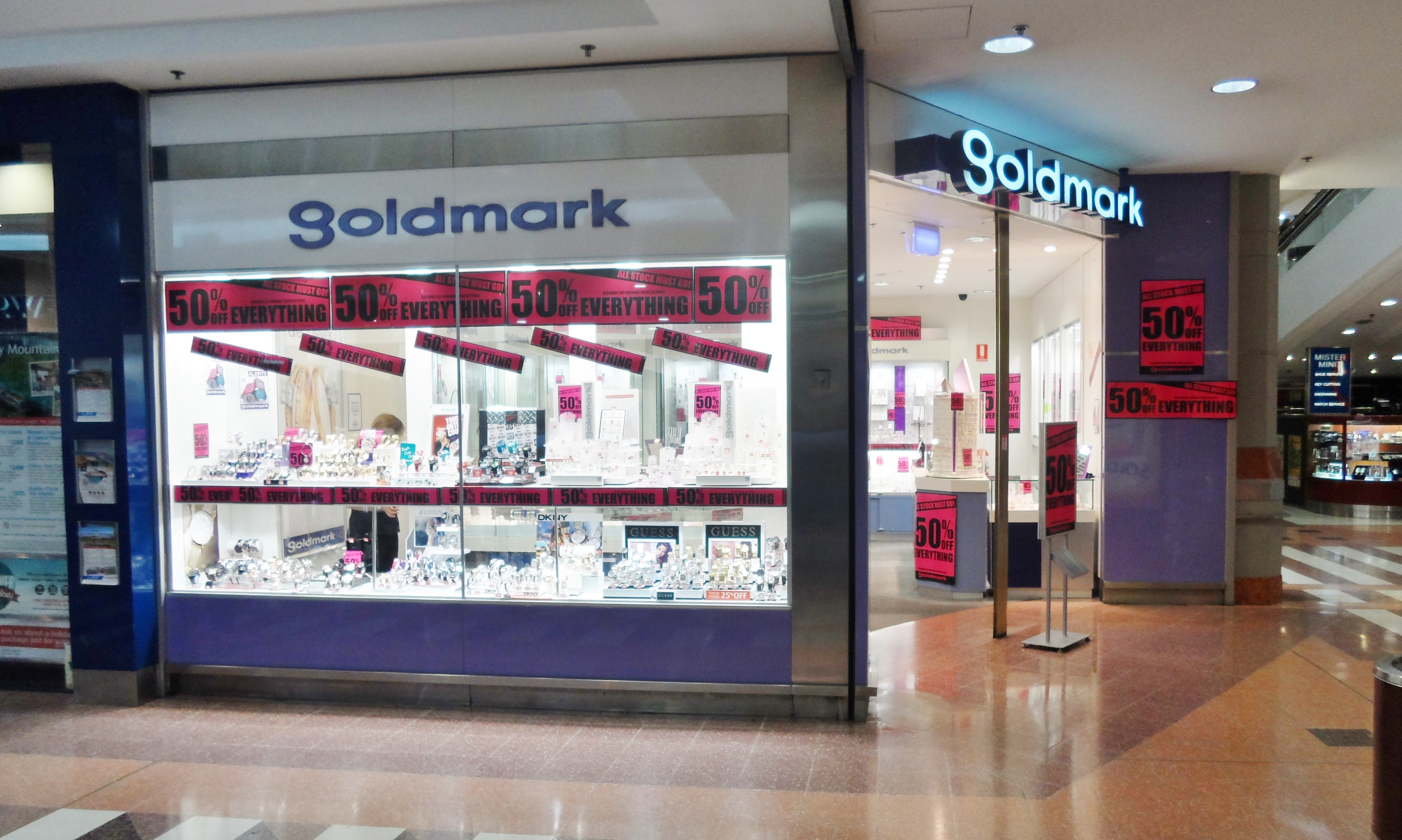
Goldmark Broadway

At the time of its purchase, David Norman was interesting in the development of a market around fashion-oriented jewellery for younger consumers, commenting Goldmark had "great potential on both sides of the Tasman." In July 2007, Goldmark entered New Zealand with 4 stand-alone stores, and replaced JPG's Prouds brand at 13 kiosks in Farmers department stores.

Currently there are 15 stores in New Zealand, 12 within Farmers. Goldmark's image and product range of 'contemporary female fashion jewellery' aligned with JPG's view of Farmers as New Zealand's 'leading fashion department store' and a focus on attracting a younger customer. As part of the JPG brand family, Goldmark also now carries watches and jewellery branded with the Chisel Farmers menswear store-brand.

=== Stevens ===
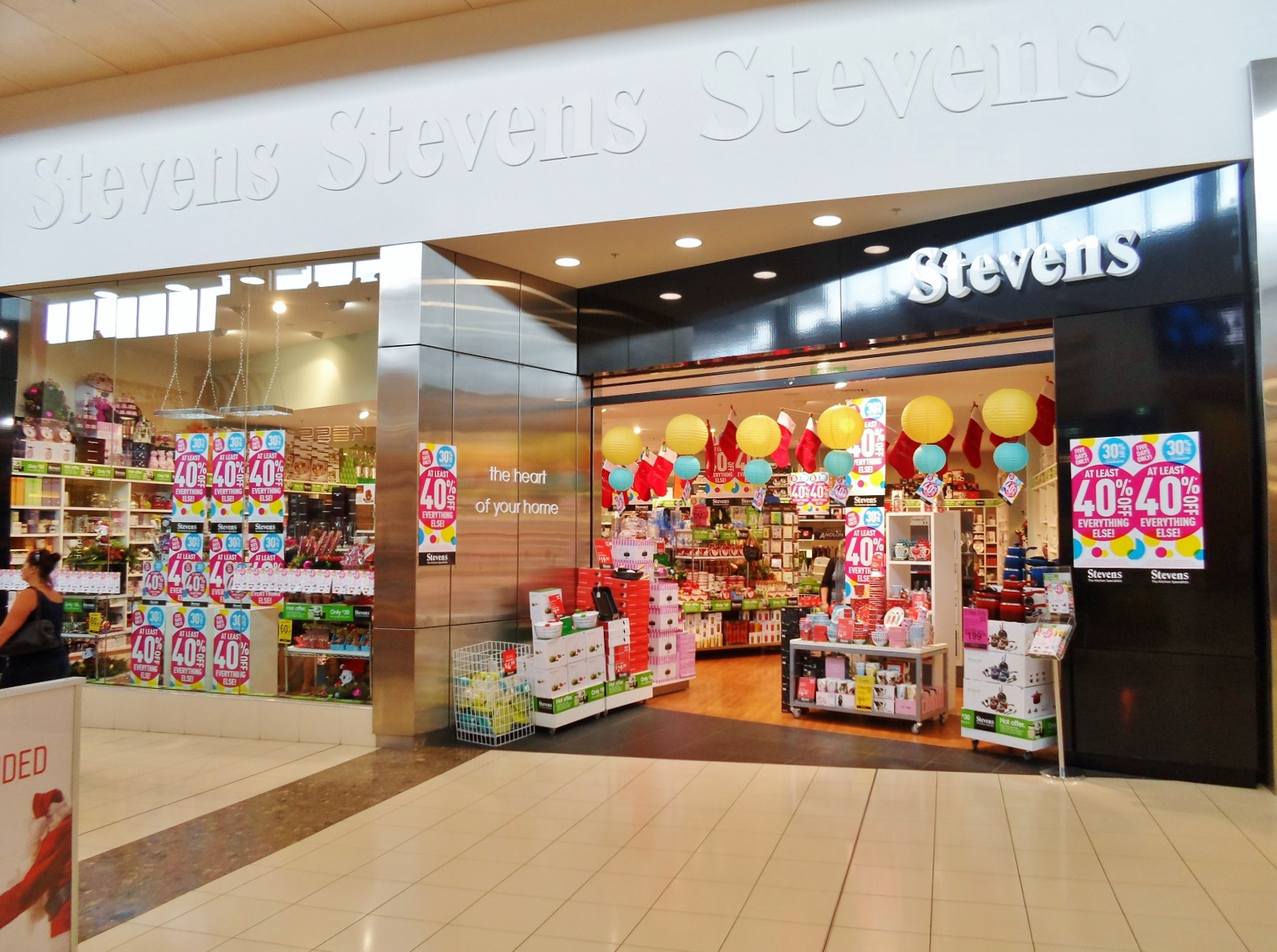
Stevens flagship Albany store

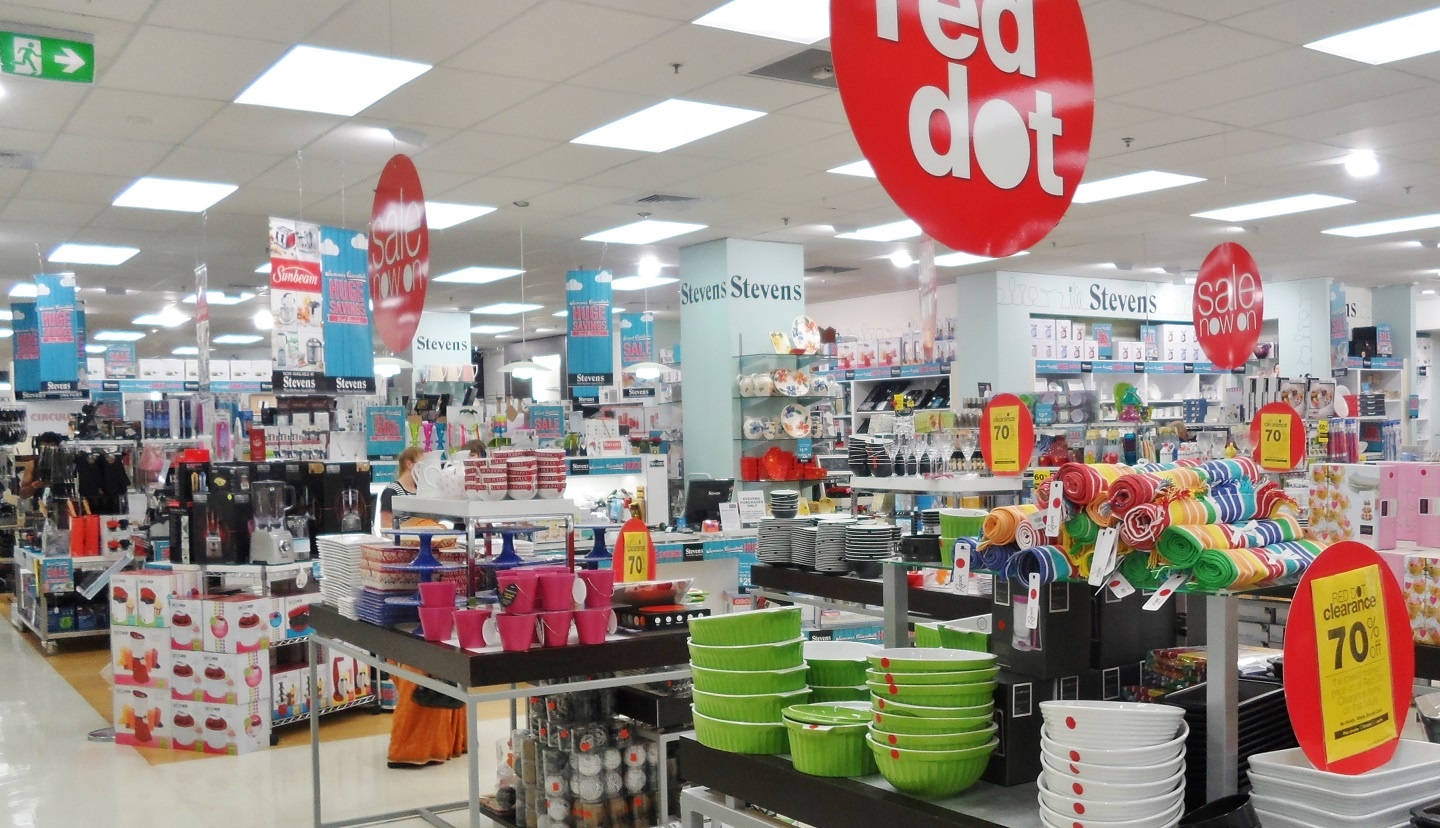
Stevens Queensgate within Homeworld department of Farmers Queensgate

Stevens was founded in Auckland, New Zealand as Henry Stevens Ltd in 1924. Its first store selling household hardware and kitchen appliances was located on Karangahape Road in Auckland. In 1946 the company was named Stevens Bros Ltd, and by 1986 had spread outside Auckland into the North Island as Stevens for Gifts. In the 2000s, Stevens upgraded and modernised its stores, expanded as far south as Christchurch, launched an online wedding Gift Registry in 2005, and a full online store in 2007.

James Pascoe Group purchased the 83-year-old family-owned kitchen, table and giftware 20-store chain in November 2007. By 2009 JPG had expanded the company to 30 stores. Formerly marketed as 'Stevens for Gifts' and 'Stevens Home & Giving', the chain is currently known as 'Stevens – The Kitchen Specialists'.

As of 2022, there are 24 Stevens stores across New Zealand. 17 of which are featured as separate stores-within-stores within JPG's Farmers department stores, alongside Farmers own arguably less upmarket Kitchen, Tabletop and Small Appliances departments. Stevens' rivals include Dunedin-based Acquisitions (22 stores) and Briscoe Group's (also Farmers largest competitor for homeware) smaller Living & Giving store (St. Lukes).

=== Whitcoulls ===
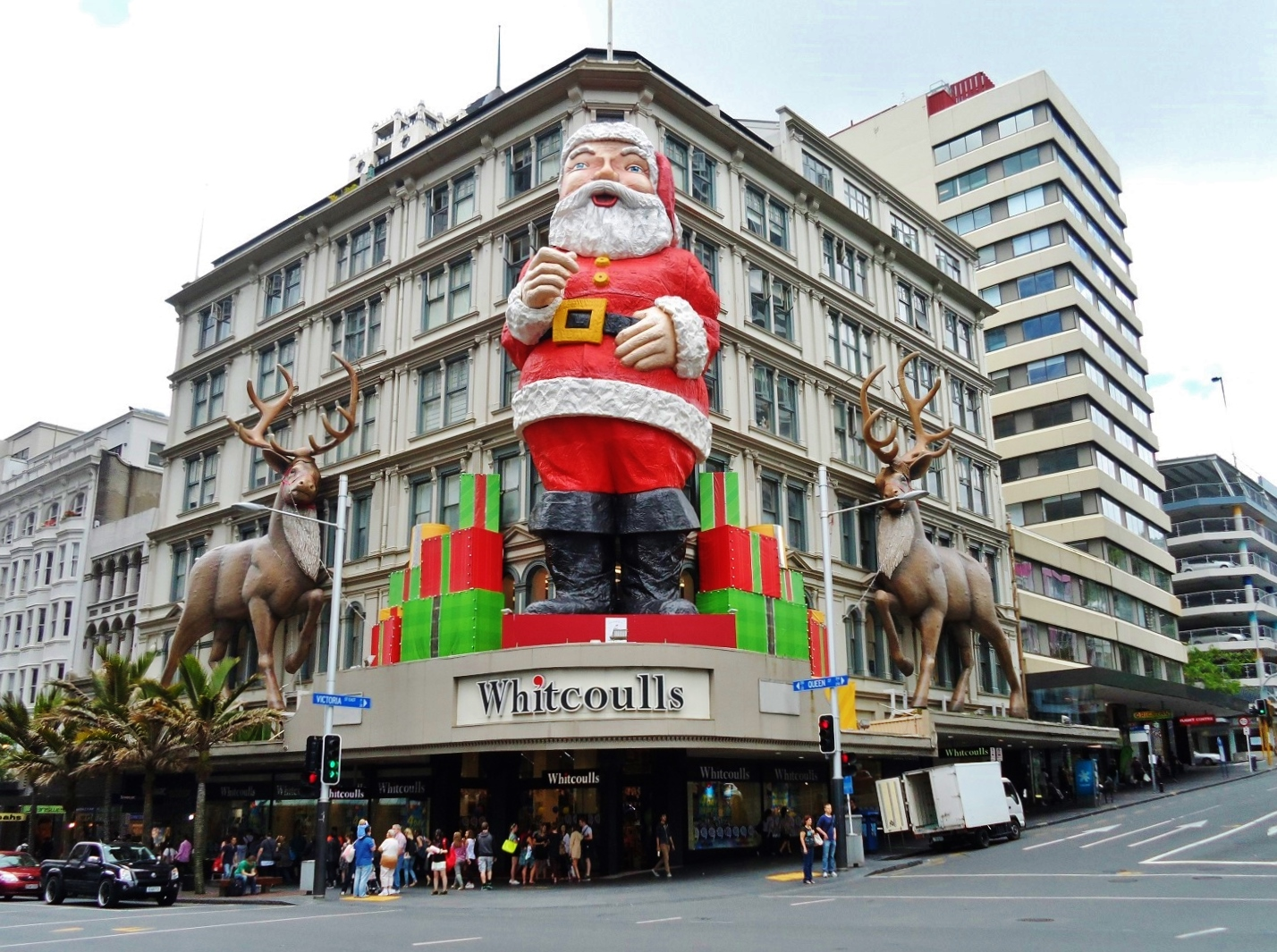
Whitcoulls former flagship Queen Street store (converted to a Farmers store in 2015)

Whitcoulls was founded in 1882 as Whitcombe & Tombs after a merger between printer/bookbinder George Tombs and publisher/bookseller George Whitcombe. The business was given its current name in 1973, following a 1971 merger with 'key competitor' Coull Somerville Wilke (itself founded in 1871). Since then, the retailer passed through several owners including British book retailer W H Smith in 2001 to private equity book retailer REDgroup Retail.

REDgroup sold the 10 airport stores to Australian travel retailer LS Travel Retail Pacific on 6 April 2011. Just weeks later, on 29 April, the 8 university-based Bennetts bookstores were sold to New Zealand private investor Geoff Spong. The rest of the nationwide book and stationery retailer became James Pascoe Group's latest acquisition in May 2011, with REDgroup being placed in voluntary administration. The sale included 57 Whitcoulls stores and 5 Borders stores with 900 staff. Today there are 59 Whitcoulls stores across the country, in addition to its online store. In 2011, one in four New Zealand households belonged to Whitcoulls loyalty scheme.

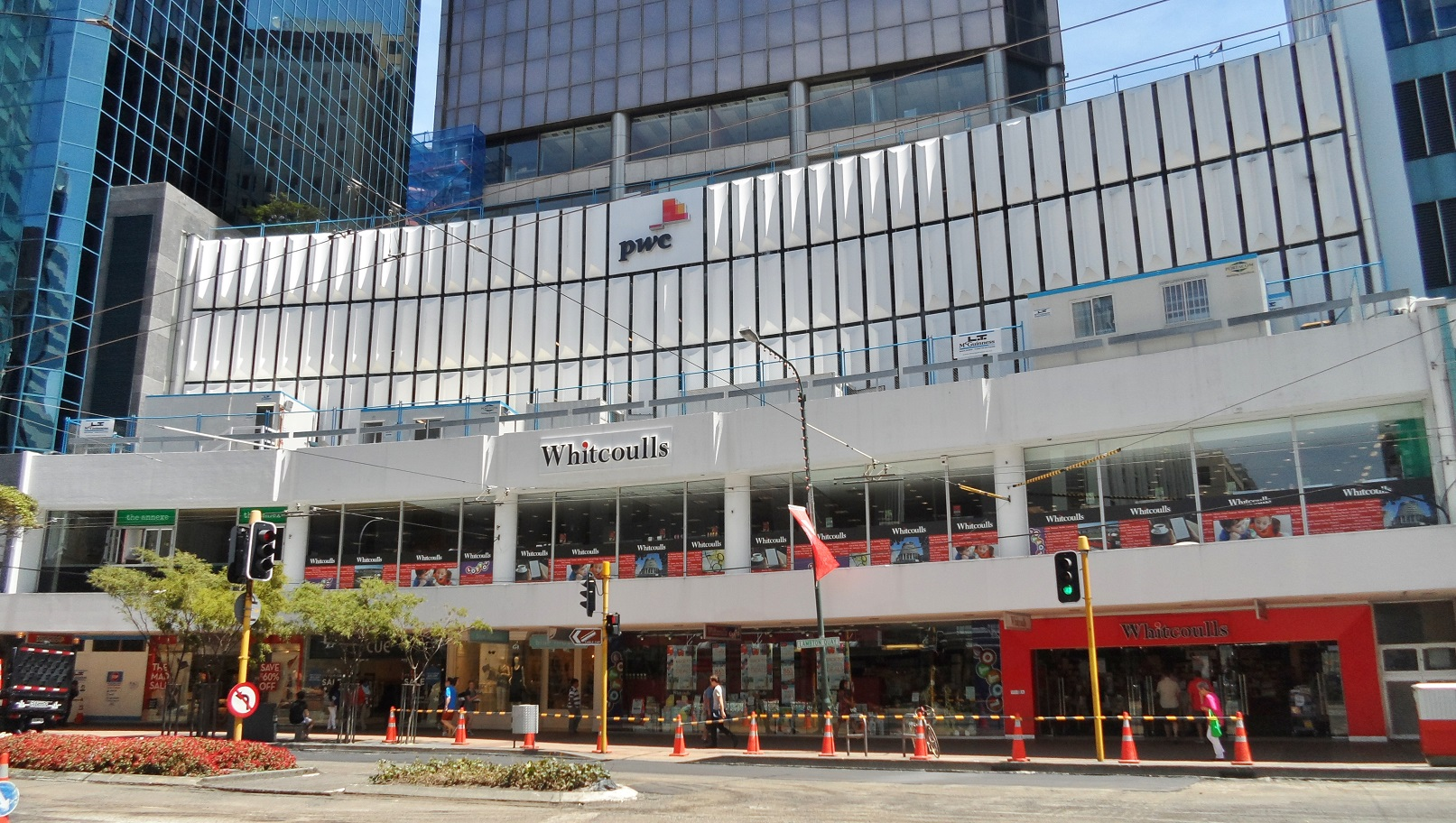
Whitcoulls Lambton Quay

At the time of the sale there was speculation JPG was buying Whitcoulls leases to expand Farmers stores. It was also rumoured the iconic 129-year-old Queen Street Whitcoulls store could be turned into an old-style inner city flagship Farmers store to rival Smith & Caughey's directly across the road. This was dismissed as 'wild speculation'. In August 2012 it was announced the Queen Street store would be receiving a more than $3 million revamp. Whitcoulls managing director Ian Draper said "Our ultimate goal is for this store to be the best book and stationery store in the southern hemisphere" Speculation ended up being true, however, when Whitcoulls Queen St closed in mid 2015 and was reopened as Farmers later that year in December. James Pascoe Group stated the decision to rebrand the Whitcoulls store to Farmers was made in light of the improved fashion and retail offering on Queen Street. Other Whitcoulls stores have received upgrades since JPG ownership. It was also speculated Farmers would begin to integrate Whitcoulls branded Goldmark/Prouds and Stevens-style store-within-stores, similar to lower South Island department store rival H & J Smith's integrated Paper Plus and Take Note stores within its two largest stores in Invercargill and Gore. As of mid-2022 nothing to this affect has materialised.

Whitcoulls rivals include Whitcoulls' nearest equivalent, franchise Paper Plus (over 100 stores), and its other brand, Take Note (7 stores); as well as The Warehouse Group's discount retailers Warehouse Stationery and The Warehouse.

== Anne and David Norman ==
The owners of the James Pascoe Group have been described as 'secretive' and 'media-shy', rarely giving interviews and not appearing in tabloid magazines. In 2006 it was reported the couple live in the affluent Auckland suburb of Remuera. Despite a reported net worth of half a billion dollars, they claim to live a modest lifestyle, with Anne shopping at Farmers. The Normans also claim not to take profits out of their companies. "We just let them grow." says David. In 2011, Metro Commercial realty Director Nathan Male said JPG's purchase of Whitcoulls was 'great for customers'. They had managed to acquire a 'string of major brands in prominent locations' without pressures from debt, in contrast to many struggling private equity investors. "The Normans have a very hands-on management style and are passionate about retailing and New Zealand."

Both raised in Auckland, Anne Pascoe met David Norman in the 1970s while he was working for Xerox in marketing and sales positions. In addition to undergoing military training, David Norman worked under the founders of the New Zealand Foodtown supermarket chain at Foodtown Kelston in Auckland. Together Anne and David formed a small construction business called Andav Holdings. Anne was the business's office manager, while David acted as foreman.

David became managing director of James Pascoe Ltd in 1978. After the purchase of Farmers Trading Company Ltd in 2003, he appeared on local consumer television show Fair Go to respond to customers complaints of unreasonably long waits for delivery of large items. He then worked in the company's chaotic distribution centre, helping to reorganise it. In 2004 he temporarily became Farmers' CEO. In 2006 he resigned as CEO to focus on newly purchased Australian Angus & Coote and Goldmark businesses. Anne worked in buying at Pascoes for years, and is involved with the buying teams at Farmers.

The couple remain JPG Directors, with David as managing director. A family business, as of 2009, the Normans' children Myles James Norman (leading Prouds the Jewellers in Australia), Victoria Ella Nicholls (née Norman), and Gregory 'Greg' John Norman (diamond buyer for Pascoes, Stewart Dawsons and Goldmark) are also involved in the operation of JPG. The Normans' son-in-law Brett Nicholls heads Stevens.

The Normans founded the annual Anne and David Norman Fellowship in Leukaemia and Lymphoma Research at the University of Auckland's medical school. The couple were both made Companions of the New Zealand Order of Merit in the 2012 Queen's Birthday Honours List.
