= William Chatfield =

New Zealand architect (1851–1930)

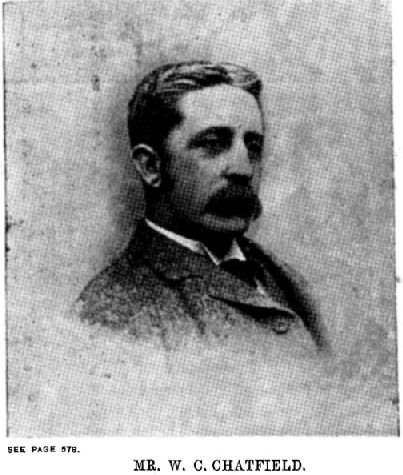
- William Chatfield
- Born: 1851; Sussex, United Kingdom
- Died: 30 May 1930 (aged 78–79); Wellington, New Zealand
- Occupation: Architect
- Buildings: Star Boating Club and Stewart Dawson's Building

William Charles Chatfield (1851 – 30 May 1930) was a New Zealand architect. He was born in Sussex and educated in Brixton, Surrey. He moved to New Zealand at the age of 16. In 1886 he designed the Wellington Opera House, which burnt down 2 years later. Two of his remaining buildings are the Star Boating Club and the Stewart Dawson's Building.

Chatfield died on 30 May 1930 aged 79.

== Early life ==
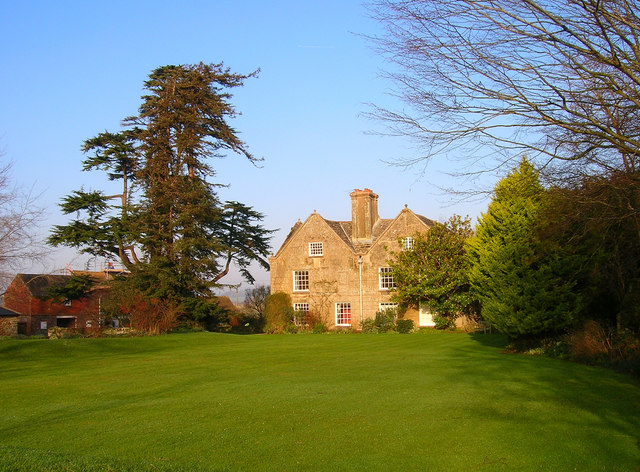
Chatfield's childhood home, Greatham Manor

William Charles Chatfield was born at Greatham Manor in Parham Park, Sussex in 1851. Chatfield's father as a magistrate and his mother was a prominent artist. Chatfield received his education in Brixton, where he likely received his architectural education, (Note: Chatfield is said to have set up practice in 1867 suggesting he had studied architecture in England.) and immigrated to New Zealand in 1867. (Note: A 'Chatfield' with no forename is recorded as arriving aboard the Wild Duck on 20 December 1867.)

== Architectural career ==
Chatfield's obituary stated he worked in the Public Works Department as a draughtsman from 1872 to 1876 but Chatfield was instead employed by the Wellington Provincial Government during this time. (Note: This is confirmed by the Appendices to the Journal of the House of Representatives which lists Chatfield's redundancy in 1877.) Chatfield was made redundant in 1876 and went into private practice. Prior to his employment with the provincial government Chatfield had a private practice according to his obituary, although no tenders in his name exist prior to 1872.

In private practice Chatfield mostly designed commercial buildings around Wellington's central business district although Chatfield did design some residential buildings in Wellington. Approximately 260 designs have been attributed to Chatfield from 1875 to 1927. Chatfield employed High Victorian plaster designs into his buildings with a notable example being the Stewart Dawson's Building. Chatfield used recycled railway irons to strengthen his designs. Most of Chatfield's work was demolished in the 1970s and 1980s.

In 1892 Chatfield and Frank Jacobsen were selected to make alterations to parliament's ventilation system. The Hawkes Bay Herald accused the government of selecting the two men over government architects due to their political leanings. The controversy did not impact Chatfield's career.

In 1894 Chatfield became president of the Wellington Association of Architects. Chatfield later became founding president of the New Zealand Institute of Architects and was a made a life member in 1928.

== Personal life ==
Chatfield married Mary Hoggard in 1874. After her death he married Mary Tuckey in 1897. The marriage took place at St Paul's Cathedral, Wellington and was well attended by Wellington's elite, with newspapers devoting significant page-length to the event. Tuckey left Chatfield in 1913.

From 1887 Chatfield lived in a villa at Island Bay that he designed and named Hurston. Chatfield was also a carpenter and designed his own furniture.

== List of works ==
Name	Date	Image	Note	Ref
Bishop's Court	1879		Registered as a category 2 building with Heritage New Zealand	
Star Boating Club Building	1886		Registered as a category 1 building with Heritage New Zealand	
Wellington Opera House	1886		Burnt down in 1888	
Hurston	1887		Registered as a category 2 building with Heritage New Zealand	
Colonial Mutual Life Assurance Building	1897			
Stewart Dawson's Building	1900		Registered as a category 2 building with Heritage New Zealand	
Kings Chambers	1902		Demolished circa 1968	
Kodak Building	1908		Demolished 1978	
GHB Wilkinson Building	1908		Registered as a category 2 building with Heritage New Zealand	
