= Wellington Rowing Association =

Rowing association in Wellington, New Zealand

- Sport: Rowing
- Founded: 1901
- Affiliation: Rowing New Zealand
- Secretary: Sally Rose

Official website
- www.rowingwellington.org.nz

Wellington Rowing Association is rowing's governing body in Wellington, New Zealand. Wellington Rowing Association is one of the 10 member associations comprising the New Zealand Rowing Association and shares the common purpose of fostering and promoting the sport of rowing in all its forms and classifications.

The association's core function is to conduct regattas in the Wellington Region.

== Member clubs ==
=== Current ===
- Horowhenua Rowing Club
- Petone Rowing Club
- Porirua Rowing Club
- Star Boating Club
- Wellington Rowing Club

=== Previous ===
- Hutt Valley Rowing Club (defunct)

== Regattas ==
=== Bishop Owen Oar ===
The Bishop Owen Oar is a time trial eights race for secondary school students. The trophy itself is an oar donated by Reginald Owen (bishop), Archbishop of Wellington, who won the oar when he was studying at Wadham College, Oxford. It is painted in Wadham colours.

=== Mothes Shield ===
The Mothes Shield is a time trial fours/quads race.

The Mothes Shield was donated to WRA in 1920 by a Petone RC president F.W. Mothes.

The Mothes Shield was originally a challenge trophy that was raced for over a 2 regattas, however, it came to be raced at a single regatta bearing its name. Initially a standard multi-laned regatta, the Mothes shield is now raced for in a time trial format based on prognostics. It is open only to four-seater crews.

=== Redding Shield ===
Redding Shield is the first regatta of the rowing season in Wellington. It is a multi-lane regatta over 500 metres.

Previously known as the "opening day regatta", a points trophy for the regatta was donated by Harold Redding, a vice president of Wellington R.C.

Wellington Rowing Club was the first club to win the trophy.

The Redding Shield has always marked the season opener ever since.

=== Norton Cup ===
Norton Cup is a multi-lane regatta over 2000 m.

The Norton Cup was donated anonymously to the WRA in 1933. According to the Evening Post, the donor wanted the WRA to stage a regatta with a format similar to the Picton regatta of the time. The cup itself is presumably named after George Norton, a well known local boat builder.

=== Queens Cup ===
Queens Cup is a multi-lane regatta over 2000 m.

=== Wellington Champs ===
The Wellington Provincial Champs is a multi-lane regatta over 2000 m. It is the crowning regatta for the Wellington Region.

=== McLachlan Shield ===
McLachlan Shield is the Wellington Secondary School Championship regatta. It is a multi-lane regatta over 2000 m.
