= Stewart Dawson's Building =

Historic building in Wellington, New Zealand

Stewart Dawson's building
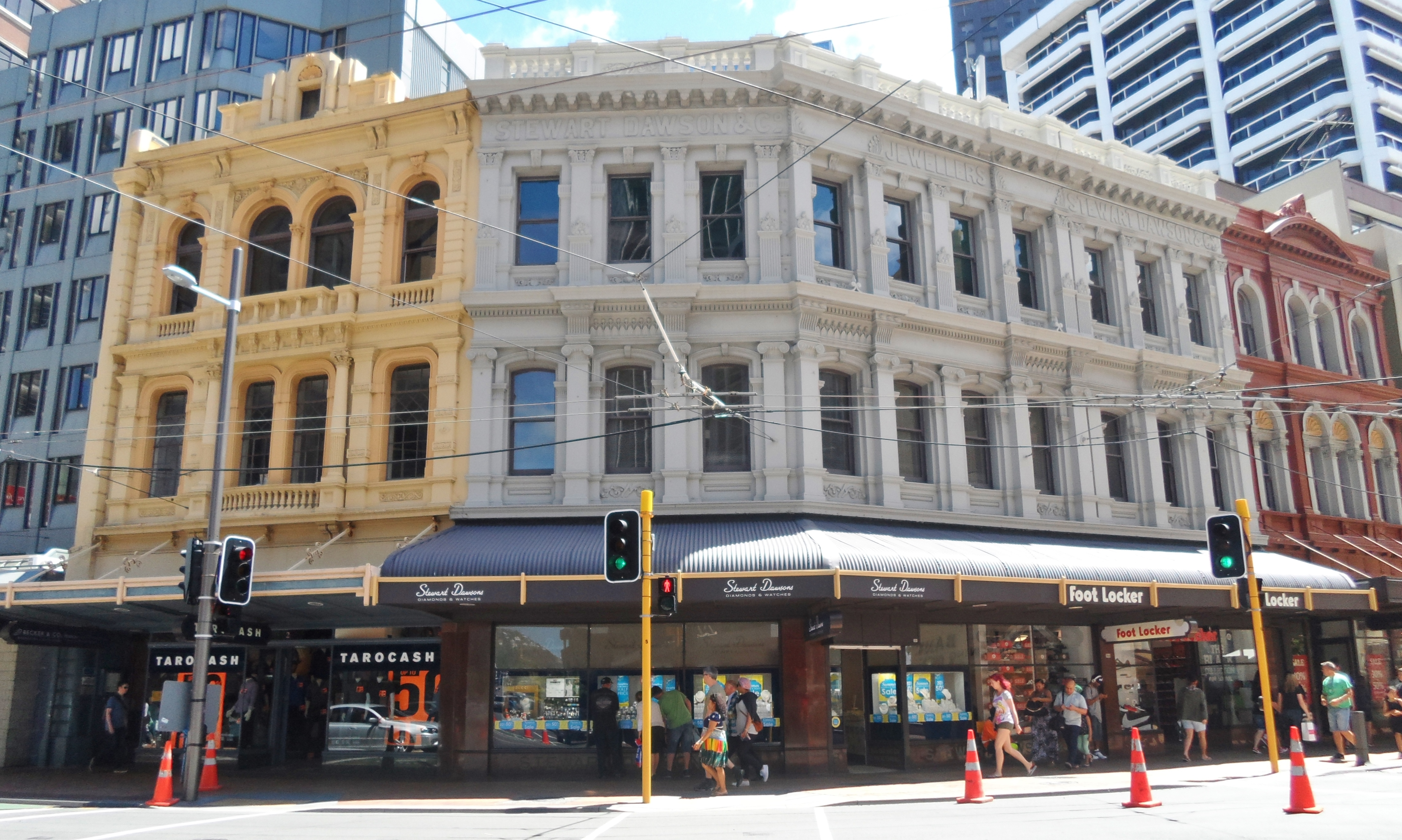
- Stewart Dawsons Building on Lambton Quay, Wellington

General information
- Location: 366 Lambton Quay and Willis Street, Wellington, New Zealand
- Coordinates: 41.2864°S 174.7761°E
- Current tenants: Stewart Dawson's, Foot Locker
- Completed: 1900–1901

Design and construction
- Architect: William Chatfield

Heritage New Zealand – Category 2
- Designated: 11-Dec-2003
- Reference no.: 1871

Stewart Dawson's building was a historic building on the corner of Lambton Quay and Willis Street in Wellington, New Zealand. The façade has been retained. Built in 1900 for the London jeweller David Stewart Dawson, it was located on a prominent corner where major thoroughfares Lambton Quay and Willis St meet. The site, commonly known as 'Stewart Dawson's corner', is particularly important to the history of Wellington.

The site had been known since the 1840s as Clay Point or Windy Point. Located on Wellington's original beach front, the site was marked as the 88th most desirable acre in Wellington by New Zealand Company selectors. In 1900 Dawson commissioned Wellington architect William Charles Chatfield to design a building to fit the triangular site. Chatfield designed a three-storey building with a front that followed the angle created by the junction of Lambton Quay and Willis Street.

Stewart Dawson's building was a fine example of Victorian commercial architecture. Italianate in style, it has a well proportioned façade with pilasters heavily decorated with fine floral ornamentation.

The building was classified as a Category 2 Historic Place by the Heritage New Zealand. In 2016 Stewart Dawson's jewellery company moved out. Stewart Dawson's building and the heritage buildings on either side of it were demolished, with the historic façades retained, and a new building is being constructed behind the façades. Argosy Property Limited, who own the site, originally planned to construct a five-storey building on the site but after the 2016 Kaikōura earthquake realised there was a market demand for larger resilient buildings and came up with a new design for a 12-storey block. The building will be fully electric and energy efficient and will be leased by the Department of Statistics and the Ministry for the Environment. Completion was due in April 2021 but after delays and cost increases a revised completion date of February 2022 was announced.
