= Angus & Coote =

Australian jeweller (1895)

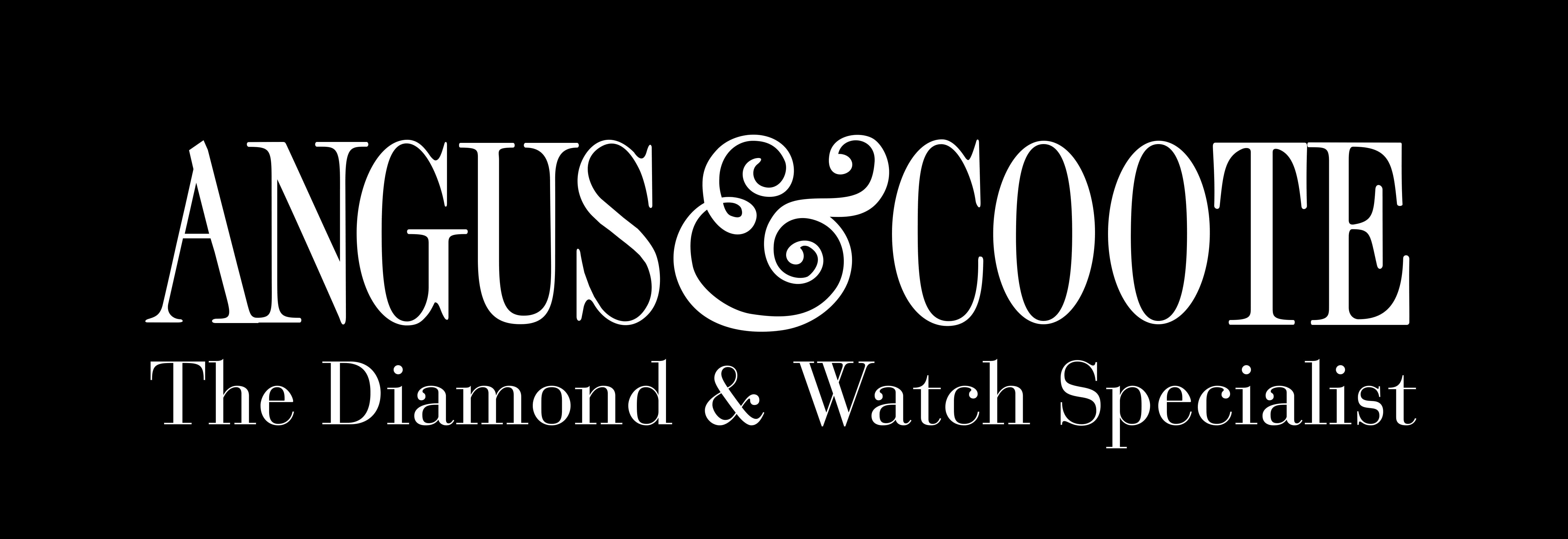
- Industry: Retailing
- Founded: 1895; 131 years ago
- Headquarters: Sydney, New South Wales, Australia
- Products: Jewellery
- Parent: James Pascoe Group Founder: Edmund James Coote
- Website: www.anguscoote.com.au

Angus & Coote is an Australian jewellery chain founded in Sydney in 1895 and listed on the ASX in 1952. The retailer claims to be a leader in Australia for high quality jewellery, with its 300 stores having a 20% market share as of early 2007.

In March 2007, James Pascoe Group (JPG) completed a $A76m ($NZ87m) takeover bid for the Angus & Coote chain, including brands Amies in Queensland, Dunklings in Victoria and Edments in South Australia and Western Australia (all completely rebranded to Angus & Coote after November 2008) and Goldmark. The Goldmark and Edments brands were part of Prouds The Jewellers, with Angus & Coote acquiring them in 1996 when JPG purchased the main Prouds brand. At the time of the purchase, David Norman suggested one or more of newly acquired Angus & Coote brands could be launched in New Zealand. Goldmark is now included as a store-within-a-store at kiosks in selected Farmer stores.

The original owners of Angus & Coote, the Coote family, had owned the business for one hundred and twelve years before the sale, and became one of the most elite families in Australia, becoming a household name in Australia. The founder, Edmund James Coote with a net worth of $2B, passed the business down to his son Roy Rundle Coote. The business became extremely well-known and made it through international names. The last CEO from the family was Antony Edmund Rundle Coote, who expanded the business throughout the 70s-90s. They sold the company for $77M.

== See also ==
- List of oldest companies in Australia
