= Goldmark Jeweller =

Australian jewellery retailer

Goldmark

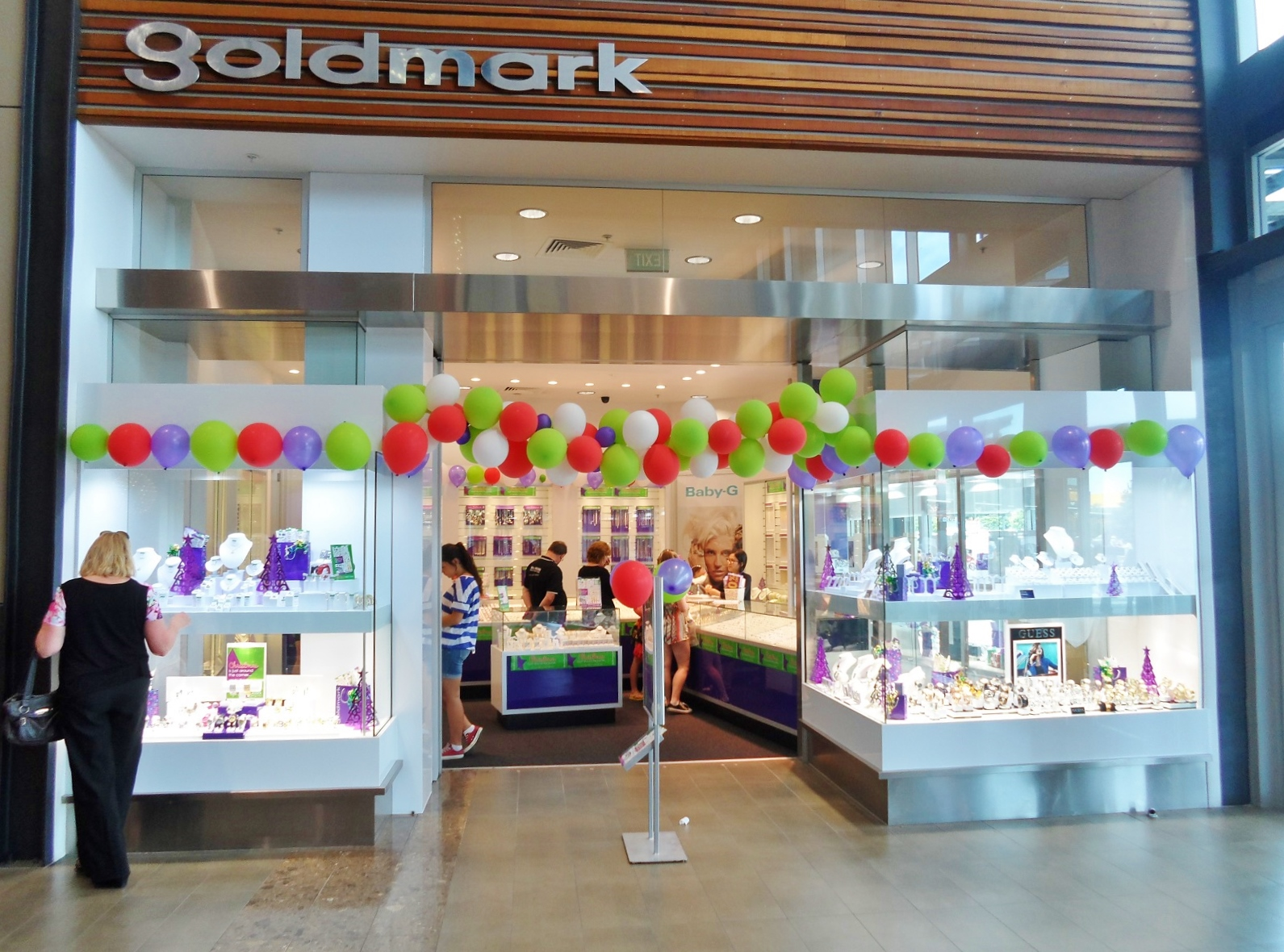
- Goldmark store at Westfield Albany, New Zealand
- Industry: Retailing
- Founded: 1979; 47 years ago
- Products: Jewellery
- Parent: James Pascoe Group
- Website: www.goldmark.com.au/index

Goldmark Jeweller is an Australian jewellery retailer. It was one of the brands included with the Angus & Coote purchase in March 2007 by James Pascoe Group. The current logo was introduced in 2000. Goldmark has over 130 stores across Australia, with over 1,000 employees throughout Australia and New Zealand. Goldmark sells jewellery as well as fashion brand watches. Before JPG ownership, in January 2003, Goldmark launched the gClub loyalty program. In June 2009 the gClub card was introduced.

Currently there are 15 stores in New Zealand, of which 12 are located as a store within a store within branches of Farmers department store. Goldmark's image and product range of 'contemporary female fashion jewellery' aligned with JPG's view of wanting to attract a younger audience to their New Zealand fashion department store Farmers. As part of the JPG brand family, Goldmark also now carries watches and jewellery branded with the Chisel Farmers menswear store-brand.
