= David Stewart Dawson =

Australian businessman (1849-1932)

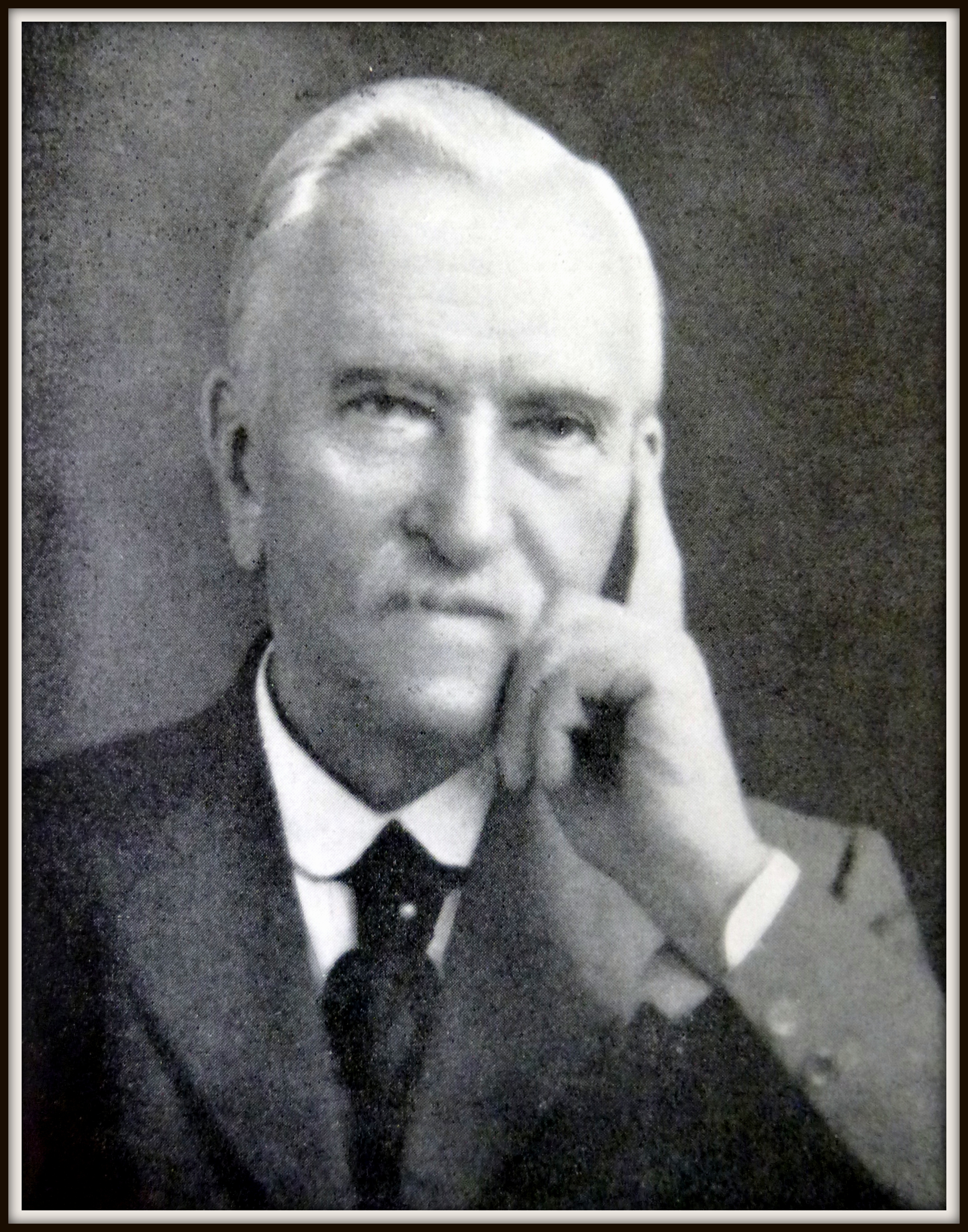
- David Stewart Dawson in 1922
- Born: David Stewart Dawson; November 25, 1849; Cairnie, Aberdeenshire, Scotland
- Died: August 6, 1932 (aged 82)
- Occupations: Businessman, jeweller
- Known for: Founder of the Stewart Dawson & Co. retail jewellery and watchmaking business

David Stewart Dawson (25 November 1849 – 6 August 1932), frequently referred to as Stewart Dawson, was an Australian manufacturing jeweller and property tycoon born in Cairnie, Aberdeenshire, Scotland.

He served his apprenticeship in Dufftown in Banffshire then founded a successful retail watchmaking and jewellery business in Liverpool, England in 1876 after moving there age 22, with shops in most large cities in Great Britain, aided by the slogan "Who watches the Police?" after winning a tender to supply watches for the Liverpool Police. Advertising in Australian newspapers brought so much business he decided to move there and emigrated in 1886. He founded the business of Stewart Dawson and Co. in Sydney and soon had branches in Melbourne, and Auckland and Dunedin in New Zealand and Regent Street in London. After making the company a limited liability company in 1907, Dawson sold the company in 1931 to RHO Hills department store (now House of Fraser). The resulting company operated until "around 1935".

He dealt extensively in inner-city real-estate, including some of the most significant transactions in Australian history. Anticipating the Great Depression, he converted much of his property (valued around £1,000,000) from ownership to rental. One significant property he owned was half of the Strand Arcade (Pitt Street end). This peculiar arrangement was to have far-reaching consequences as a result of piecemeal development and inconsistent maintenance.

He was noted for his contribution to the war effort, and served on many committees.

He founded the Ambassadors Restaurant, Pitt Street, in 1923, long one of the most fashionable in Sydney.

He had a head office, "The Treasure House" (built 1907) in Hatton Garden, London and homes in Potts Point and Palm Beach, Sydney, a villa in Monte Carlo and a three-storey country mansion, "Bon Accord" in Springwood in the Blue Mountains, close to Norman Lindsay's home.

On his death the Monte Carlo villa went to his widow, Harriet Stewart Dawson (née McNab) (1864–1945) who married Prince Michal Radziwill, "Ordynat" (entailed estate holder) of the Palace and estate of Antonin in Ostrow County, Poland (1870–1955) in 1938. "Bon Accord" was kept as a guest house by his heirs, managed by Hugh D. McIntosh, but burned down in 1937.

The James Pascoe Group is the current owner of Stewart Dawson's stores, which are a luxury jewelry retailer with 15 locations in New Zealand. James Pascoe Group, acting as the groups's luxury jeweler in New Zealand. The Stewart Dawson's brand is no longer in used in Australia, however thirteen stores remain across New Zealand.
