= George Cooke (rower) =

New Zealand rower

Personal information
- Birth name: George Campbell Cooke
- Born: 17 March 1906; Blenheim, New Zealand
- Died: 23 May 1941 (aged 35); Servia, Greece

Sport
- Sport: Rowing

George Campbell Cooke (17 March 1906 – 23 May 1941) was a New Zealand rower who competed in the 1932 Summer Olympics. He was a member of the New Zealand boat which was eliminated in the repêchage of the eight competition.

Cooke was born in Blenheim. He was killed in action during World War II at Servia, Greece. He was a Corporal in the New Zealand Army, and died of wounds during the Allied retreat in the Greek campaign of 1941.
