= Arthur Barnett =

Arthur Barnett may refer to:

- Arthur Barnett (department store), a New Zealand department store (also erroneously known as Arthur Barnett's)
  - Arthur Barnett building, the former flagship store building for the chain in Dunedin, since demolished and replaced by the Meridian Mall
- Arthur Barnett (businessman) (1873–1959), founder of the former chain
- Arthur Doak Barnett (1921–1999), American journalist and political scientist

== See also ==
- Arthur B. Spingarn (Arthur Barnette Spingarn, 1878–1971), American civil rights leader
