= H & J Smith =

New Zealand retail company (1900-2023)

H&J Smith Holdings Ltd
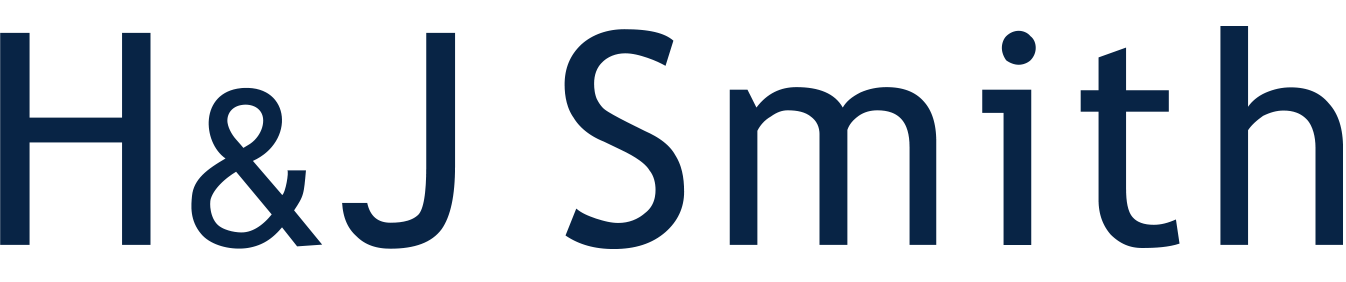

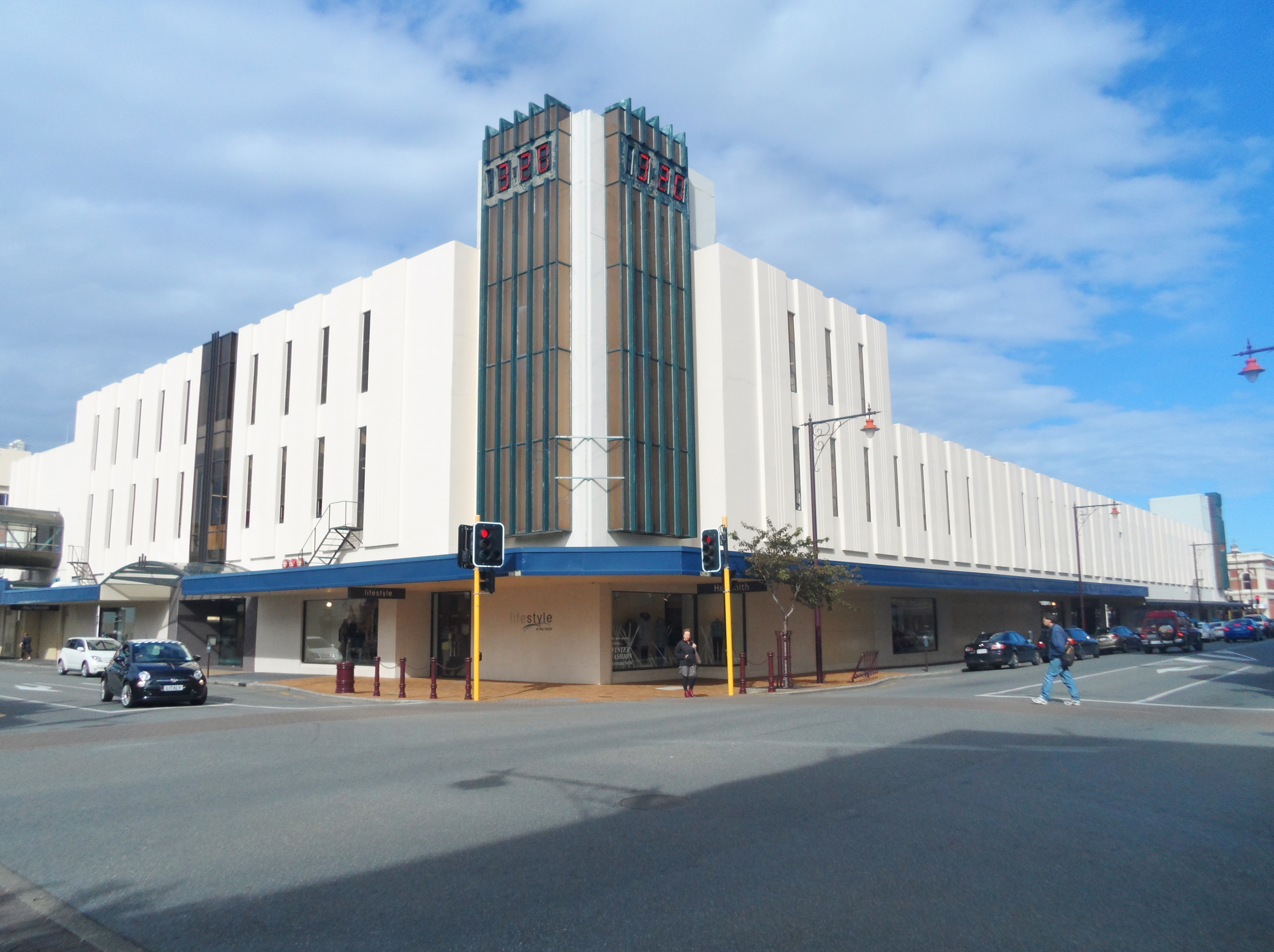
- H & J Smith Invercargill before closure
- Type: Limited company
- Industry: Retail
- Founded: 1900; 126 years ago
- Headquarters: Invercargill, New Zealand
- Website: hjsmith.co.nz

H & J Smith Holdings Ltd, branded as H & J Smith (known colloquially as H&J's or Smith's) was a company which operated in the lower South Island of New Zealand. The company was founded in 1900 and closed in 2023. It operated a network of franchises. The company previously operated department stores around the South Island with the flagship store in Invercargill.

== History ==
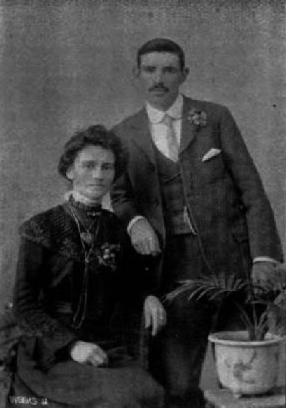
Helen and John Smith, co-founders of H & J Smith

1900 - H & J Smith was established by brother and sister John Smith and Helen Hay Smith in 1900 as a drapery store in Invercargill. The original H & J Smith store was located at 125 Dee Street in Invercargill, this store was expanded in size in 1905.

1905 – H & J Smith opened their second store in the Southland town of Gore, with the original store being in the Criterion Hotel building on the Main Street of Gore.

1910 – H & J Smith Invercargill was relocated to 48 Tay Street. The second Invercargill store was expanded in size in 1917.

1911 – H & J Smith opened a branch store in the Southland town of Riverton located at the corner of Napier and Palmerston Street. The Riverton store closed in 1919.

1913 – H & J Smith Gore store was relocated to the corner of Main Street and Irk Street. Extensions were made to the Gore store in 1931. In the early years the upstairs portion of the store housed the Women's club and a dental surgery. H & J Smith Gore operated at this location for 107 years until 2020.

1922 - H & J Smith purchased the Price & Bulleid building located at 66 Tay Street with the Invercargill store relocated to this location. When the new store opened the ground floor covered half an acre and the number of employees had grown to 131. This store was extended in size over the following decades with the store eventually spanning from Tay to Esk street. H & J Smith Invercargill remained in this location until 2023 when H & J Smith exited the department store division of the business.

1940 – A clock tower was erected at the corner of Tay and Kelvin streets of the Invercargill store. The original clock tower had multiple analogue clocks facing Kelvin Street, Tay Street and the street corner.

1954 - Queen Elizabeth II visited Gore and dined at the Women's club located in the H & J Smith building.

1958 – Invercargill store extended to Esk Street with the completion of a 3-storey building on the corner of Kelvin and Esk street. The Esk Street extension allow the main isle of the store to run from Tay Street to Esk Street.

1967 – Purchase of Thomson & Beattie with Arthur Barnett Ltd. T&B had been operating a drapery store for almost 100 years and had stores in Bluff, Gore, Tay Street Invercargill and Windsor Street in Invercargill. The Bluff and Gore Thomson & Beattie stores were closed, Windsor rebranded as H & J Smith and the Tay Street Invercargill store later used for Outdoor World.

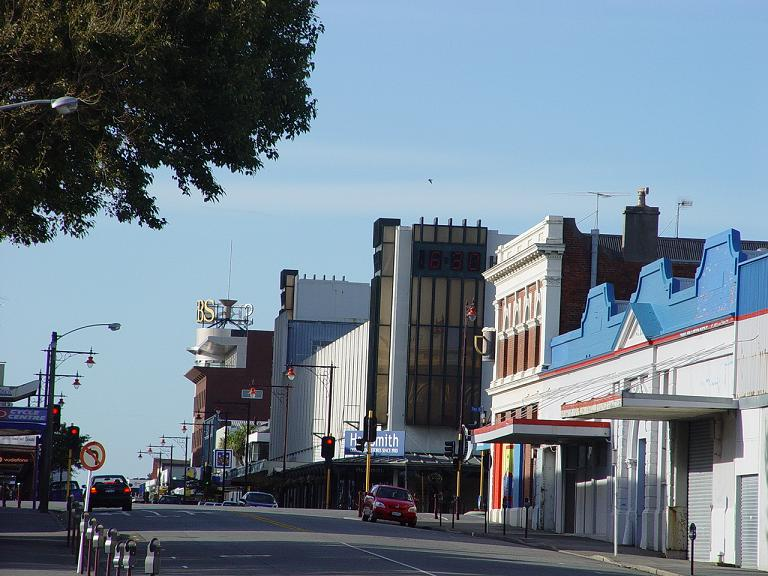
H & J Smith Invercargill, corner visible with combined Temperature/Clock display

1969 – Frontage of the Invercargill store remodelled replacing the various facades used across the buildings to a single façade. The analogue clock at the Tay and Kelvin street end was replaced with a digital time and temperature clock and a second clock tower at the corner of Esk and Kelvin street was built.

1970 - Viking Room restaurant opened in the H & J Smith Gore store located at the rear of the first floor.

1971 – H & J Smith purchased Queenstown Drapery store WH Wheatley, located on Ballarat Street in Queenstown. The store was rebranded as H & J Smith the same year. Purchases of adjoining properties allowed the company to expand the store in size.

1972 – Sports store H & J's Outdoor World opened in the former Thompson & Beattie store located at 25 Tay Street in Invercargill.

1974 - H & J Smith purchased W Mackay & Sons Ltd in Nelson. The store was rebranded as H & J Smith Nelson the same year creating a presence for H & J Smith in the Nelson region and later leading to branch stores being created in the Nelson region.

1975 – Purchase of Columbia Products which later became H & J's Carpet World.

A multi storey car park building is built on Esk Street across the road from the H&J Smith Invercargill store.

1980 – Purchase of Marguerite Leatherware and Hide Shop Ltd, The Hide Shop sold tourist merchandise with the original store located in Colombo Street in Christchurch. Hide Shop stores were opened as stores within H & J Smith stores during the 1980s and as standalone stores including a Hide Shop store in Taiwan.

1983 – A skybridge between the Esk Street car park building and the H & J Smith Invercargill store is opened.

1984 – Video Station franchise stores opened inside H & J Smith Invercargill, Gore and Nelson stores. Video Station was a video rental store. These stores were closed in 1990 with the retail space in Invercargill converted into a jeans store.

1985 - H & J Smith Finance Ltd is established to provide finance for customers making purchases on Hire Purchase.

1987 – Purchase of Ace Stores in Te Anau, the store was remodelled and rebranded as H & J Smith Te Anau. The remodelled store included a time and temperature clock similar to the clock on the Invercargill store.

Purchase of Miss Nelson store which was located on Bridge street next to the H & J Smith Nelson store and a branch store in Richmond. H & J Smith Nelson store was extended into the Miss Nelson store and the Richmond store became a H & J Smith Richmond branch store.

1989 - H&J Smiths purchased the building on Esk street next to the department store, at the time this location was most recently used by the Invercargill Licensing Trust as a liquor store and before this was home to Watts & Greive Ltd, a Morris car dealer. H & J Smiths took over the Invercargill Mitre 10 franchise which was originally located on Yarrow street and relocated the Mitre 10 store to the premises next to H & J Smiths with an entrance between the two stores created.

1992 – H & J Smith Stoke store is opened in the Nelson region in the former Trathens of Nelson Stoke branch store.

H & J Smith purchased the premises on corner of Tay and Deveron streets Invercargill to be used by H & J's Carpet World and H & J's Electrical.

1993 - Big Scotty's a discount furniture store is opened on Clyde Street Invercargill.

London Bookshops franchise opens inside H & J Smith Invercargill store, becomes Books and More in 1998.

Gun City franchise opened inside Outdoor World store.

Purchase of Tapper's Ltd, relocated to Tay Street premises with Carpet World and Electrical.

1996 – H & J Smith Nelson store is rebuilt. The rebuild took place in stages allowing H & J Smith to continue to trade in the same location while construction took place.

1999 - H & J Smith Gore store refurbished, Viking Room Restaurant replaced with The Junction Café and relocated to the front of the store on the First floor. Main entrance relocated to the corner of Main Street and Irk Street. Books and More franchise added to the Gore store including NZ Post Services.

2000 - H & J Smith celebrates the centennial of the company.

Construction of three new stores at Remarkables Park in Frankton, Queenstown. The stores included a Big Scotties furniture store, Element (Outdoor store) and a new location for Queenstown Mitre 10.

Following the closure of the Hallensteins store in Gore, H & J Smith takes over the lease of the store and the Gore store is extended into the former Hallensteins store with the space used as the Menswear department.

2001 – Purchase of Arthur Barnett Balclutha store, rebranded as H & J Smith Balclutha.

2002 – H & J Smith Blenheim store opens.

2005 – Mitre 10 Mega store is opened in Invercargill on the corner of Tay Street and Elles Road in the former Woolworths Supermarket.

H & J Smith Windsor Street store is closed.

2006 - H & J Smiths exits the Nelson region with the Motueka, Richmond and Stoke stores closed in 2005. The Nelson and Blenhiem stores were closed in 2006.

H & J Smith Queenstown store is relocated to the Remarkables Park centre.

H & J's Appliance Centre is opened in the former Mitre 10 store on Esk Street, closed in 2011.

2009 - An espresso bar, Mooch Cafe is opened next to the Tay Street entrance of the Invercargill department store.

2011 - The Invercargill Paper Plus franchise, which H & J Smith had purchased in 2010, was incorporated into the main Invercargill store, replacing a Take Note franchise. Postal services were removed at this time, however in 2019 postal services were reinstated after the Invercargill Post Shop closed down.

2014 - H & J's Outdoor World on Tay Street is relocated to the former Mitre 10 and Appliance Centre building following a major rebuild of the store. Outdoor World rebrands as Outdoor H & J Smith.

2015 - Purchase of Arthur Barnett Dunedin store, rebranded as H & J Smith Dunedin.

Queenstown Mitre 10 store was relocated to Shotover Park in 2015 as a Mitre 10 Mega store.

2019 - In February 2019 the Gore store was consolidated to a single floor with the public toilets and Soft Furnishings the only parts remaining on the First Floor. The consolidation to a single floor saw the closure of the Junction Café in 2018.

2020 - All H & J Smith stores were required to close during the Level 4 COVID-19 lockdown.

On 25 May 2020, it was reported that H & J Smith was considering closing its stores in Dunedin, Mosgiel, Balclutha and Te Anau as well as the Armoury Store in Dunedin and Outdoor World in Queenstown as a result of the economic effects of the global COVID-19 pandemic in New Zealand. H & J Smith would maintain a presence in Gore but downsize the store. The store closures were confirmed in June 2020 with Balclutha and Te Anau stores closing in late July, the Gore store downsized and the Outdoor World store in Queenstown closed at the end of August. These closures affected 60 employees. On 19 June, H&J Smith confirmed that it would be closing its Dunedin department store in January 2021 and the Armoury Store in the nearby Wall Street precinct.

2021 - H & J Smith Dunedin and Armoury Fashion Boutique in Dunedin are closed.

H & J Smith Mosgiel is taken over by Longbeach Holdings Ltd trading as APT Collections.

2023 - In May, H&J Smith announced that they proposed to close all of their remaining department stores (Invercargill, Gore, Queenstown) by November citing a decline in the department store model and the cost of renovating and strengthening the Invercargill flagship. The other stores owned by the group (Mitre 10 Mega Queenstown, Mitre 10 Mega Invercargill and Laser Electrical) would not close but they would look at selling off their Gun City, Paper Plus and school uniform services. On 26 June 2023, the decision was finalised to shut down the department stores on 18 November 2023, with a loss of 220 jobs.

Following the confirmation of H & J Smith's decision to exit the department store business the following departments were taken over by H & J Smith staff or suppliers:

- H & J Smith Gore was taken over by Longbeach Holdings Ltd trading as APT Collections.
- Longbeach Holdings opened an APT Collections store in the Invercargill Central Mall employing H & J Smith staff to manage and work in the store.
- Armoury Fashion Boutque was taken over by H & J Smiths fashion buyer and continues to operate in the H & J Smith building.
- The Gun City franchise was taken over by the parent company and continues to operate out of the Outdoor H & J Smith building, with access to the rest of the building removed.
- School uniform shop The U Shop is created by H & J Smith and The Uniform group.
- Paper Plus Invercargill was taken over by the store manager and continued to operate inside the H & J Smith Invercargill store until April 2024 before relocating into the E Hayes and Sons building.
- Curtain Call Soft Furnishings department taken over by an H & J Smith employee trading as Scarlett Rose Interiors.
- Remarkable Park Menswear was taken over by an H & J Smith employee trading as Mr Davis Menswear.
- Lingerie prosthetics fitting service taken over by the Southland Cancer Society.

H & J Smith Remarkable Park store closed on 28 October 2023.

H & J Smith Invercargill store closed at 3pm on 18 November 2023. Managing director Jason Smith and CEO John Green did a final walk around the store accompanied by bagpipes before the doors were closed for the final time.

== Department stores operated by H & J Smith ==
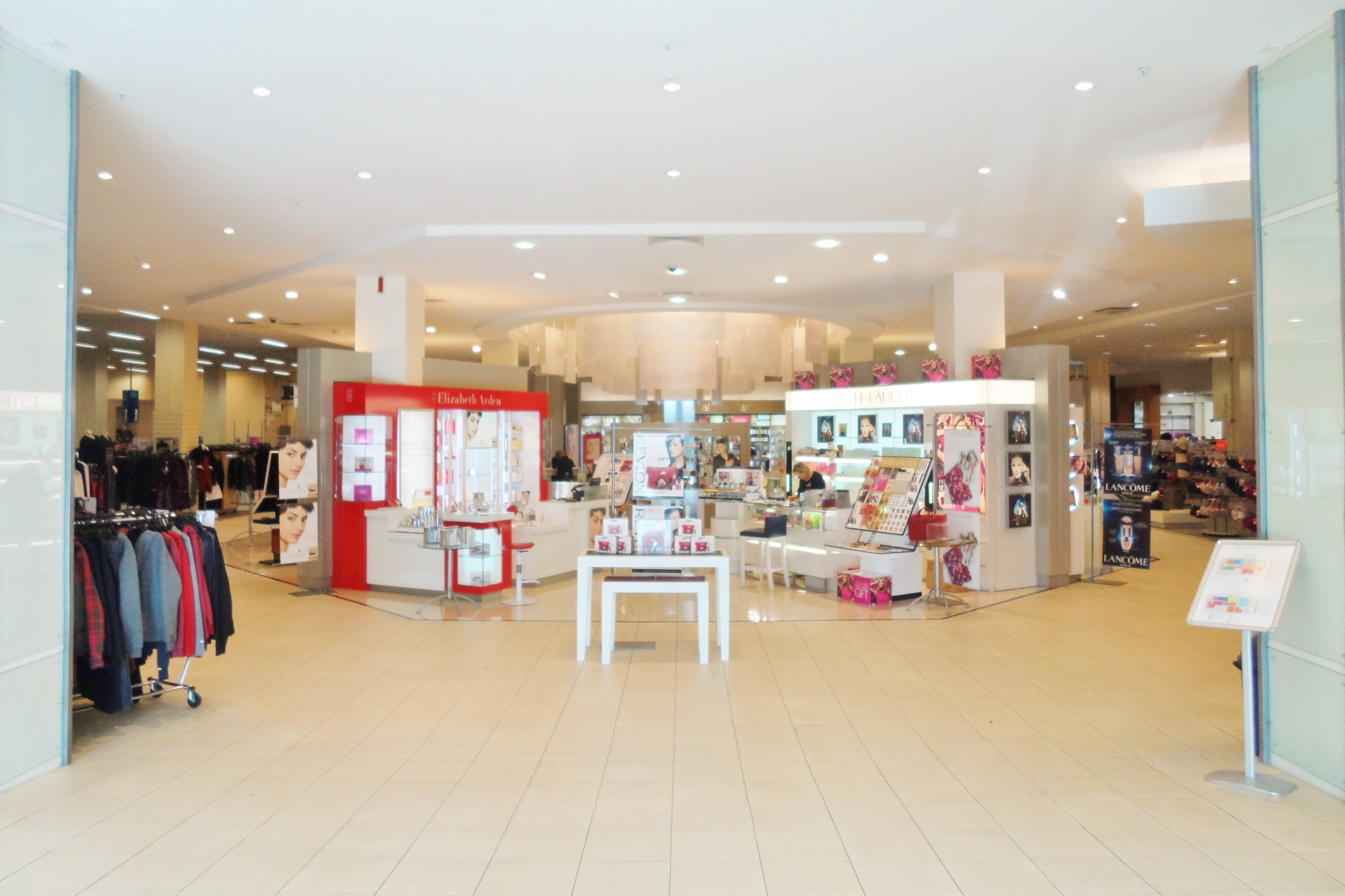
Cosmetics at H & J Smith Invercargill

=== H & J Smith Invercargill (1900 - 2023) ===
The Invercargill Department Store was the flagship store, with by far the most floor space (at 12,000 m^{2} taking up the width of a city block) and largest offering.

Departments prior to the store closing included Cosmetics and Fine Fragrance, Ladies' Fashion, Men's Fashion, Lingerie, Accessories (including jewellery and watches), Footwear, Icebreaker, Paper Plus, Waxx surf shop, uproar streetware, and Armoury Fashion Boutique on the Ground Floor. The First Floor includes Furniture, KidsWorld (including Fashion, Nursery and Toys), Soft Furnishings, Home Linens, Giftware (including Kitchenware tableware and Home Decor), Function Room, Gift Registry, Mother's Room, Main Office and toilets. H & J's also sold School Uniforms and Luggage.

The store included a café restaurant branded as The Copper Kettle on the upper floor, and MOOCH Espresso Bar on the ground floor. The Invercargill store included a Sky Bridge connecting the store to a paid car park building across the road on Esk Street.

Historic departments included Dressmaking fabrics which was removed in 2009 and an appliance department. The appliance department was originally located on the second floor as a Betta Electrical franchise and became its own store the H & J's Appliance Centre in 2006. The Appliance Centre was closed in 2011.

During the 2000s the Invercargill store was subject to major renovations including the addition of twin escalators, where in the past there was only one escalator going in the up direction. A larger cosmetic department located in the centre of the Esk Street end of the store was added in 2003, as well as an extensive Fine Fragrance area.

=== H & J Smith Remarkables Park - Queenstown (1971 - 2023) ===
The Remarkable Park store was located in the Remarkable Park shopping centre in Frankton. The store was the newest and most modern, but still featured the traditional cream interior colour scheme of the other stores. The store offered limited Cosmetics and Fine Fragrance, Ladies Fashion, Men's Fashion, Kids Fashion, Nursery, Lingerie, Accessories, Footwear, Luggage, Giftware, Home Linens, Bedding, and Furniture.

H & J Smith Ltd began operating in Queenstown since 1971 when H & J Smith purchased Queenstown Drapery store WH Wheatley, located on Ballarat street in Queenstown. In 2000 a new store was built in the Remarkables Park Town Centre shopping centre which in addition to H&J Smiths included retail space for an Outdoor store (originally known as Element) and Mitre 10. The Queenstown department store was relocated to Remarkables Park in 2006. The H & J Smith Remarkables Park store was closed on 28 October 2023.

=== H & J Smith Dunedin (2015 - 2021) ===
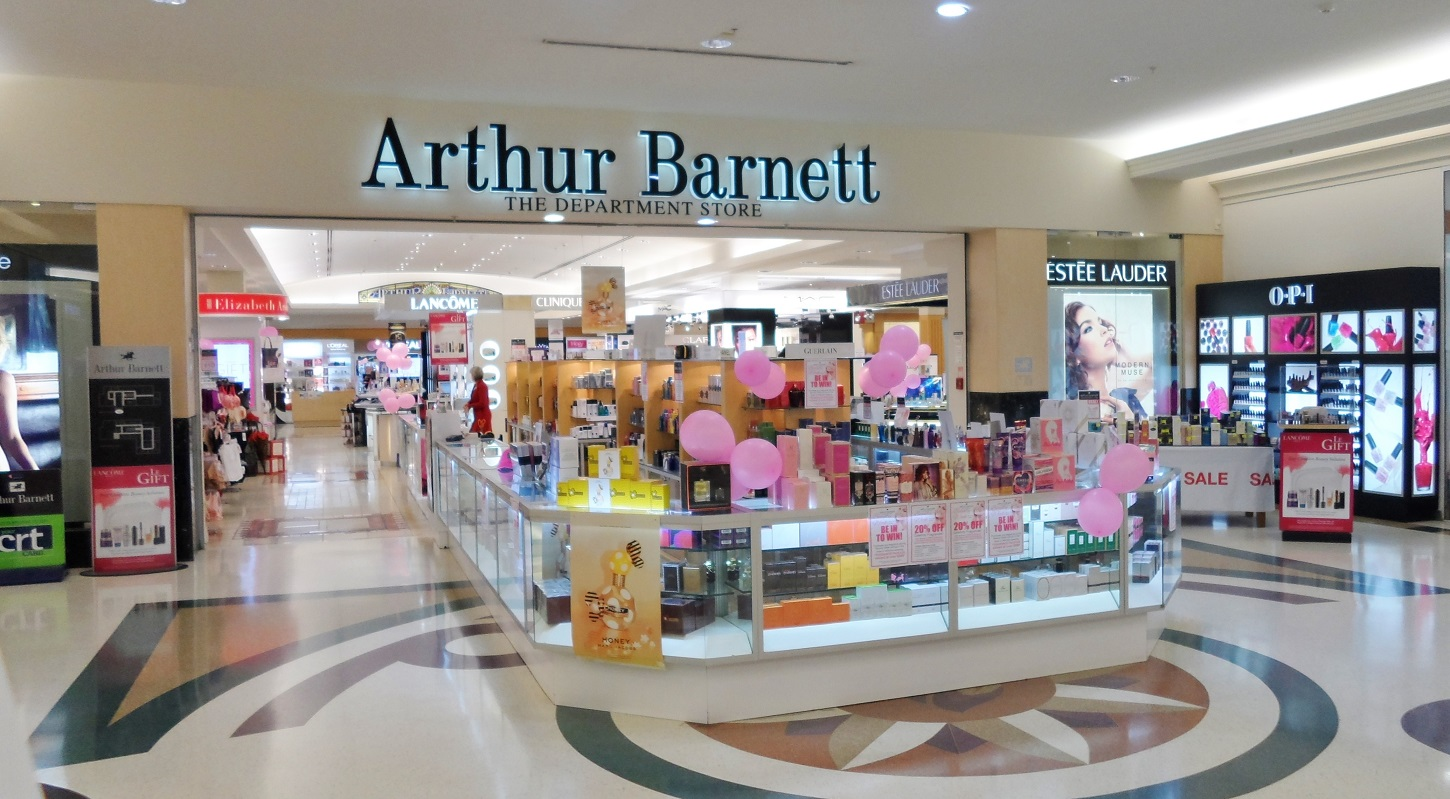
Arthur Barnett prior to rebranding as H & J Smith Dunedin

H & J Smith took over the longstanding Dunedin department store Arthur Barnett in 2015 and operated this store until January 2021. The history of the Dunedin store dates back to 1903 as Arthur Barnett's flagship store. The Dunedin Arthur Barnett store building was remodelled into Dunedin's Meridian Mall between 1995 and 1997 with Arthur Barnett the anchor tenant in the Meridian Mall. At its prime, Arthur Barnett operated 5 stores across Otago. By the time of purchase, it had declined to a store in Dunedin and an online store. The online store was reformatted into H&J's first foray into online retailing. Arthur Barnett was sold to H & J Smith in June 2015 and after a short period continuing under its original name, store was rebranded to align with H&J's other department stores. At the time of the H&J Smith takeover a section of the store was sub-leased to ToyWorld Dunedin, this arrangement had been in place since 2010 when the local franchise holder relocated from a ToyWorld store on Dunedin's Vogel street to a section of Arthur Barnett. This agreement came to an end in 2018 and the ToyWorld store closed with the section replaced with H&J Smith's toy department. Following the rebrand from Arthur Barnett to H&J Smith the cafe was rebranded as Mooch Cafe, the same as the Invercargill store.

The store, within Dunedin's Meridian Mall on the main shopping street of George St, was H & J Smith's second-largest department store after its Invercargill flagship. Departments included Cosmetics, Ladieswear, Menswear, Lingerie, Accessories, Childrenswear and Toys, School Uniforms, Casual Living, Home Linens, Furniture, as well as an in-store 'espresso bar' café. The cosmetics department offered H&J's largest selection of prestige beauty brands.

On 19 June 2020, H & J Smith confirmed that it would be closing down its Dunedin branch in January 2021. The Dunedin store closed on 30 January 2021.

=== H & J Smith Balclutha (2001 - 2020) ===
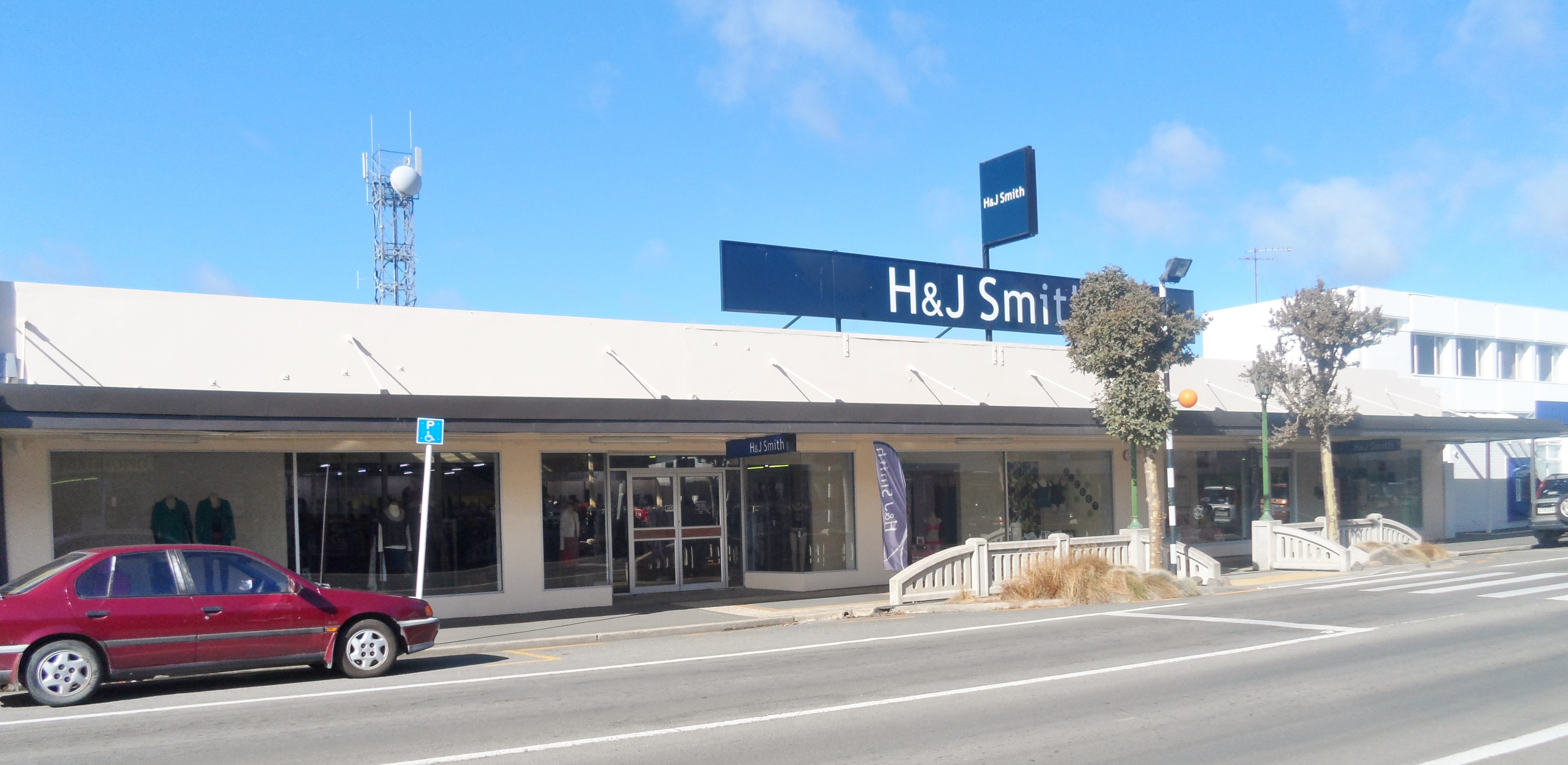
H & J Smith Balclutha

H & J Smith operated a department store on Clyde Street in Balclutha between 2001 and 2020, the store was taken over from Arthur Barnett in 2001. The Balclutha store was small in comparison with H & J's other department stores, and carried a limited offering, but was large compared to surrounding retailers in Balclutha. In the past the store was on 2 floors with a furniture and home appliance offering. Prior to closure the store offered Ladies', Men's and Children's Apparel, footwear, Revlon cosmetics, Giftware (kitchen and tableware), Home Linens and kids toys.

In early June 2020, H&J Smith confirmed that it would be closing its Balclutha branch in July 2020. The Balclutha stored closed on 1 August 2020.

=== H & J Smith Gore (1905 - 2023) ===
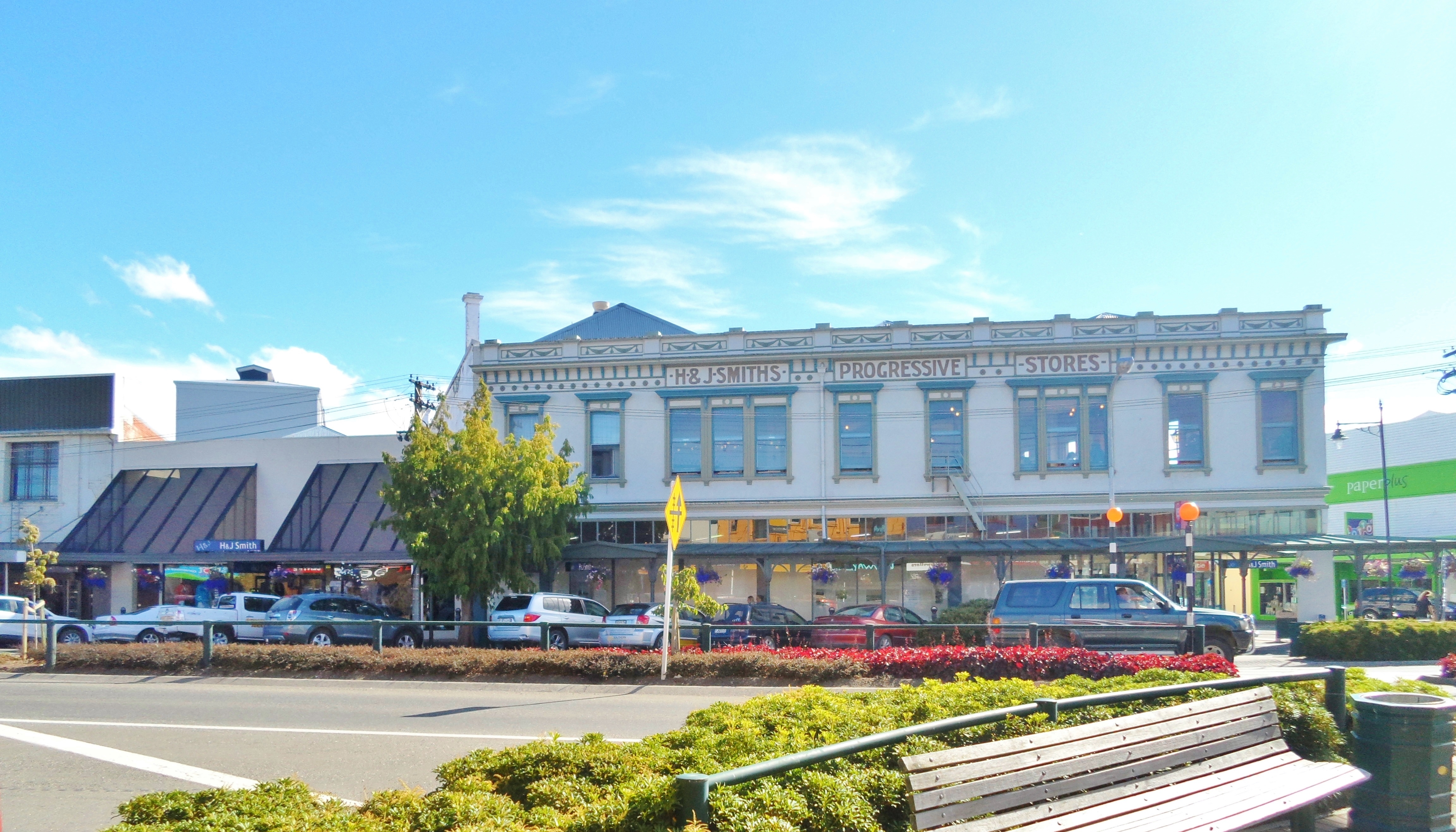
H & J Smith Gore

H & J Smith opened their second store in Gore in 1905 originally in the Criterion Hotel building. H & J Smith Gore was relocated to a new building on the corner of Main street and Irk street in 1913 and remained in this building for 107 years, until September 2020 when H & J Smith in Gore was downsized to a smaller store.

Departments that were offered in the Gore store prior to 2019 were Ladieswear, Lifestyle, Childrenswear, Mens/Boyswear, School uniforms, Lingerie, Take Note (including NZ Post and Kiwibank), Giftware, Accessories, Cosmetics, Toys/Nursery and Footwear on the Ground Floor. Furniture, Soft Furnishings, Fabrics, Home Linens, and Office on the First Floor. The First Floor also included a large tea room branded as Junction Café and public toilets.

In February 2019, the Gore store was consolidated to a single floor with the Junction Cafe closed in 2018, and the Fabrics and Furniture offering removed.

In early June 2020, H & J Smith confirmed that their Gore branch would be further downsizing with the original store closing and relocated into the former Hallensteins building next door that H & J Smiths had used as the menswear department. The New Zealand Post services were moved across the road into the Paper Plus store. Part of the H & J Smith Gore store has now been tenanted by a local retailer called Interior Warehouse. The rear of the ground floor is now tenanted by Hello Banana.

Following the relocation to a smaller store the offering was reduced to Ladies and Mens fashion clothing, Footwear, Accessories and School Uniforms.

In August 2023, following the announcement of H & J Smith deciding to call time on their department store business the Gore store was taken over by Longbeach Holdings Ltd trading as APT Collections.

=== H & J Smith Mosgiel (2015 - 2021) ===
H & J Smith Mosgiel was a small fashion boutique located on the main street of Mosgiel. This store offered Ladieswear and a dry cleaning service. The Mosgiel store was sold to Longbeach Holdings Ltd in 2021 and reopened at the end of February 2021 as APT Collections.

=== H & J Smith Nelson (1974 - 2006) ===
H & J Smith operated a group of stores in the Nelson region with the flagship Nelson store located at 60/80 Bridge Street and branch stores located in Blenheim, Motueka, Richmond and Stoke. The history of the Nelson store dates back to the early 1860s as W McKay & Sons with the original stores being located in Hokitika and Greymouth. W McKay & Sons purchased Everett Brothers in Nelson in 1913 including the Bridge Street location. H & J Smith purchased W McKay & Sons in 1974 with the Nelson store rebranded as H & J Smith. The flagship store was expanded in size in 1987 when H & J Smith purchased the neighbouring business Miss Nelson. The Nelson store was rebuilt in 1996. In 2006 H & J Smith exited the Nelson region with the branch stores closed in 2005 and the Nelson and Blenheim store closed in 2006. Today the H & J Smith Nelson store is tenanted by Noel Leeming.

=== H & J Smith Te Anau (1987 - 2020) ===
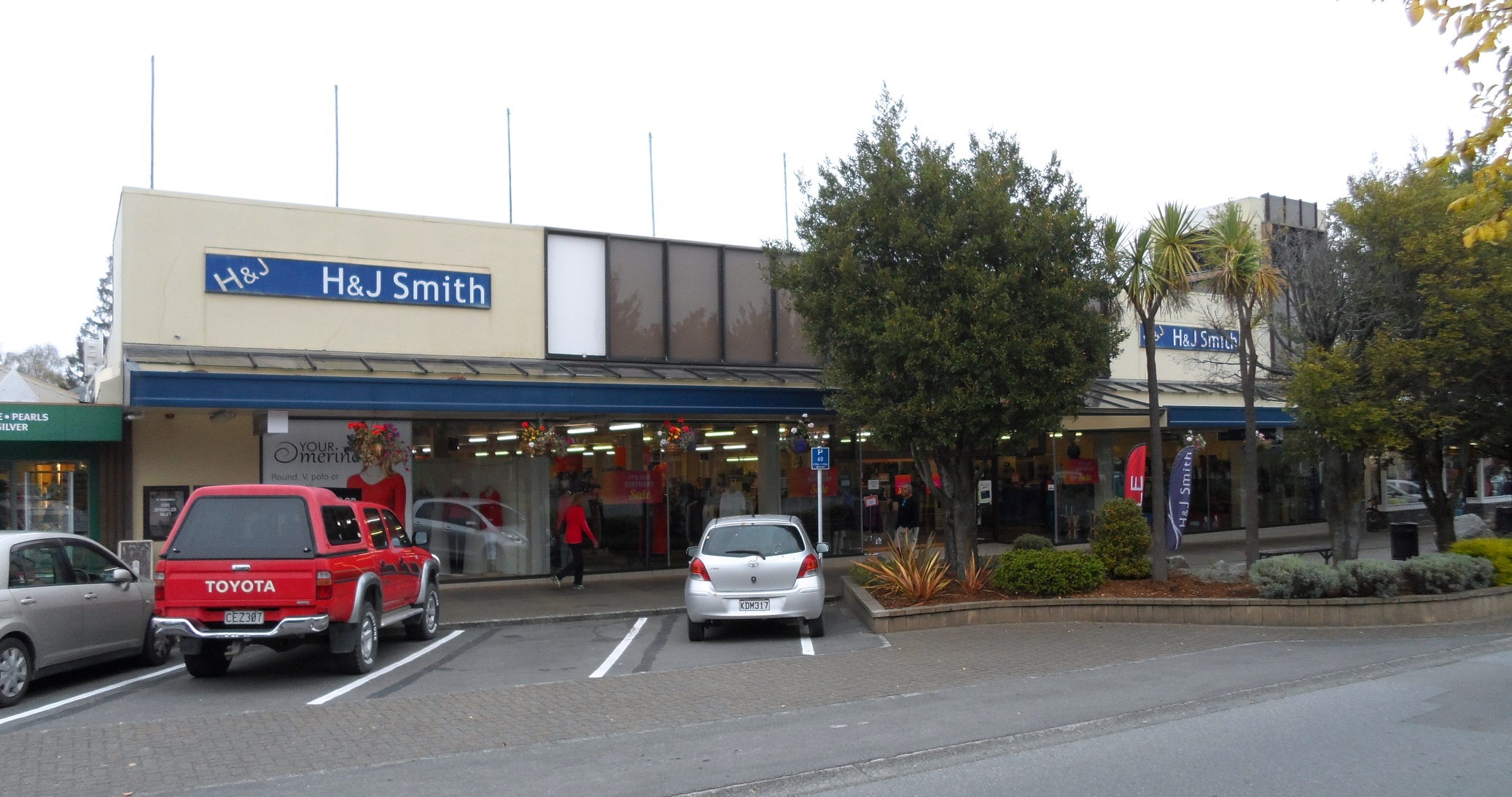
H & J Smith Te Anau

H & J Smith Te Anau was a department store located in the Te Anau town centre and operated in Te Anau for 33 years between 1987 and 2020. The history of this store dates back to 1963 when business partners Dirkje Veenstra and Christina Mooyman opened The Ace Store in Te Anau. H & J Smith purchased The Ace Store on 4 April 1987. The building at this time was extensively remodelled and included the addition of a Temperature/Clock display similar to the one in the Invercargill store. In the early days the store included H & Js Carpet World in a shed at the rear of the store, The Hide Shop (a souvenir shop) was part of the original store but integrated into the main store in 1997.

The Te Anau store initially traded as a full department store including whiteware, furniture and gifts. At the time of closure the offering included the Apparel, Home Linen, Footwear departments offered in the other stores. The store was always on a single floor. In early June 2020, H&J Smith confirmed that it would be closing its Te Anau branch in July 2020. The Te Anau store closed on 1 August 2020.

=== Outdoor at H & J Smith Invercargill (1972 - 2023) ===
A sporting goods store, originally known as Outdoor World in Invercargill. The Outdoor Invercargill store was located on Esk Street Invercargill next door to the H & J Smith Invercargill department store with an entrance between the two stores. H & J's Outdoor sold a range of outdoor clothing, camping equipment, sports equipment, bikes including a bikes workshop, hunting and fishing gear and firearms. H & J's Outdoor operated the franchise for Gun City in Invercargill.

Outdoor World opened in the former Thomson and Beattie drapery store at 27 Tay Street Invercargill in 1972, the original store was on 2 levels. In 2014 Outdoor World relocated to Esk Street.

In August 2023 the Gun City franchise was taken over by the parent company and continues to operate in the former hunting and fishing space within the H & J's Outdoor store.

=== Outdoor at H & J Smith Queenstown (2000 - 2020) ===
An Outdoor store operated in Frankton, Queenstown in the Remarkables Park shopping centre originally known as Element before rebranding to Outdoor World followed by Outdoor. Outdoor in Queenstown had a similar offering to the Outdoor Invercargill store.

In early June 2020, H & J Smith confirmed that its Outdoor World branch in Queenstown would be closing down in August, resulting in the loss of ten jobs. The Outdoor store in Queenstown closed on 29 August 2020.

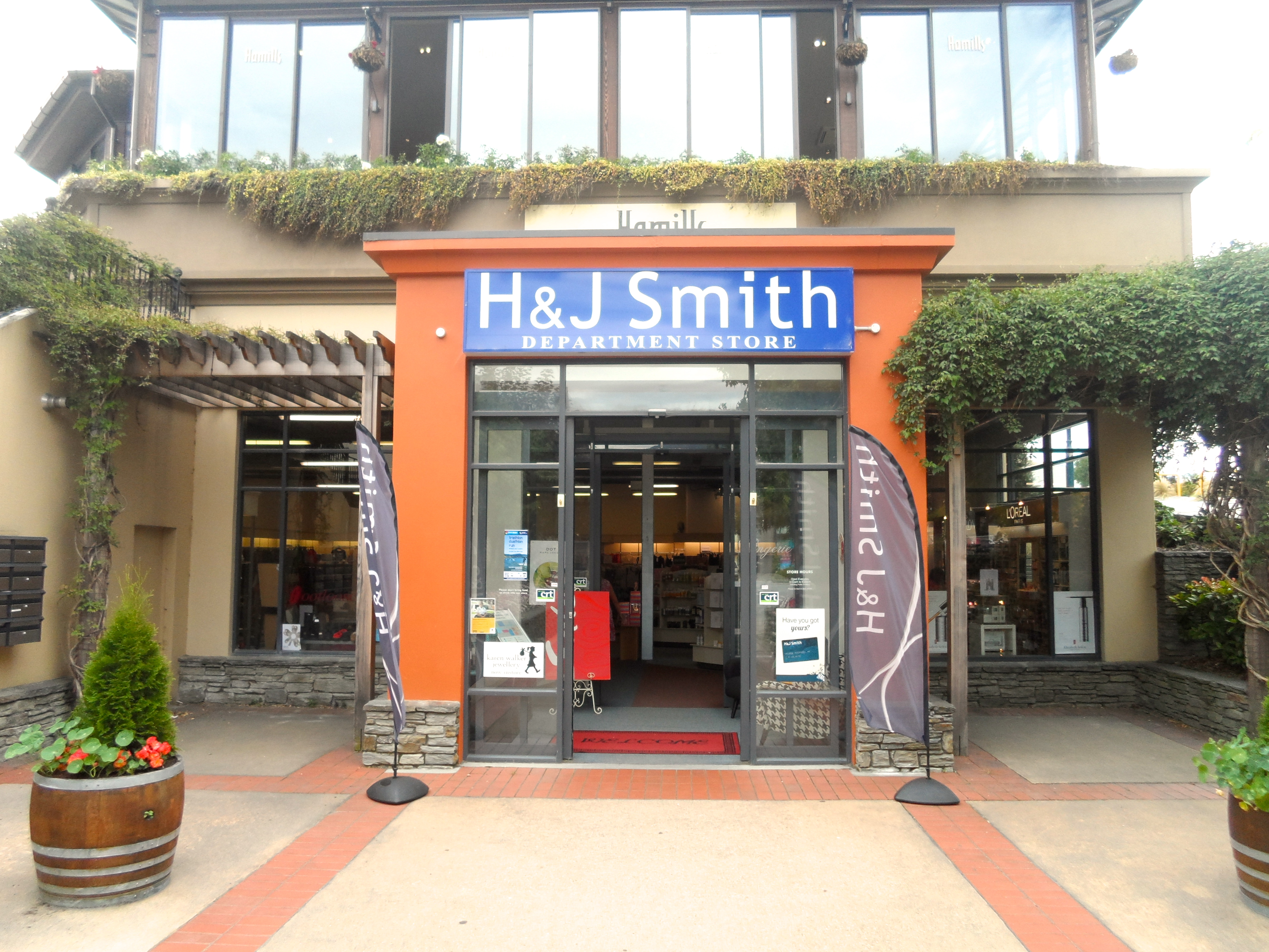
H & J Smith Remarkables Park

== Franchises operated by H & J Smith ==
=== Mitre 10 MEGA Invercargill ===
The Mitre 10 MEGA store in Invercargill is owned by H & J Smith. H & J Smith's Mitre 10 was first opened in 1988 next to the Invercargill department store. In 2004 H & J Smith indicated their intentions to upgrade the Invercargill store to a Mitre 10 MEGA store. The new store was built in the former Woolworths Supermarket which had only been operating in the Central Business District of Invercargill for 4 years. The Burger King restaurant next to the Woolworths Supermarket had to be demolished and rebuilt in another part of the car park to accommodate the Mitre 10 Mega store. The Mitre 10 Mega store was opened in March 2005.

=== Mitre 10 MEGA Queenstown ===
H & J Smith also operate the Mitre 10 MEGA store in Shotover Park in Frankton. The original Mitre 10 store in Queenstown was opened in 1993 and was located on Gray street. The store moved to the Remarkable Park shopping centre in 2000. As early as 2003, H & J Smith revealed intentions to build a new Mitre 10 MEGA store in Frankton, and after several attempts to gain resource consent the MEGA store was finally opened in 2015.

=== Laser Electrical Invercargill ===
Originally known as H&J Smith Electrical and located on Tay Street this electrical contracting business is now a Laser Electrical franchise located on Bond Street. The company offers an appliance repair service as well as a household and business electrical service. In the past there was also a H&J Smith Electrical business in Queenstown but this has now closed down.

== Other stores operated by H & J Smith ==
=== Armoury Fashion Boutique ===
Armoury is a ladies' fashion boutique store. H & J Smith operated Armoury stores in Invercargill, Dunedin and Queenstown. The Armoury brand was created as a consolidation of stores H & J Smith had recently purchased, DT Carter in Invercargill and Queenstown and French Floozie in Dunedin.

The Dunedin Armoury store originally known as French Floozie was located in the Wall Street Mail and was closed in January 2021 when H & J Smith closed their Dunedin department store.

The Queenstown Armoury store was located in the Remarkable Park shopping centre and was integrated into the H & J Smith Remarkable Park store in 2022.

The Invercargill store is located at the Esk street corner of the department store; this store was formerly called Lifestyle. In August 2023 the Armoury store was taken over by Tania Roderique and continued to operate inside the H & J Smith Invercargill department store. In June 2024 Armoury was relocated to its own store on Esk Street.

=== Big Scotty's (1993 - 2010) ===
Big Scotty's was a furniture store operated on Clyde Street in Invercargill selling lounge, bedroom, dining and home entertainment furniture. A Big Scotty's store was opened at Remarkables Park in Queenstown in 2000 and closed years later with the retail space later used for the Remarkable Park Department store. In October 2010, it was announced that this store would be closing.

=== H & J's Carpet World ===
H & J's Carpet World was a carpet store on Tay Street in Invercargill selling a large range of carpets, vinyls and mats. This store was taken over by Flooring Xtra.

=== H & J's Tappers (1993 - 2003) ===
Tappers was a cycle store originally located on Dee Street in Invercargill with a history dating back to the 1920s. Ted Tapper took over the business from his father and uncle in the late 1970s. H & J Smith purchased Tappers in 1993 and relocated the business to the Tay Street premises next to H & J's Carpet World and H & J's Electrical. Ted Tapper continued to manage the business until his retirement in 1998. In 2003 Tappers was sold to Paul Yeo and in 2009 Tappers was closed by the new owner.

== Gallery ==
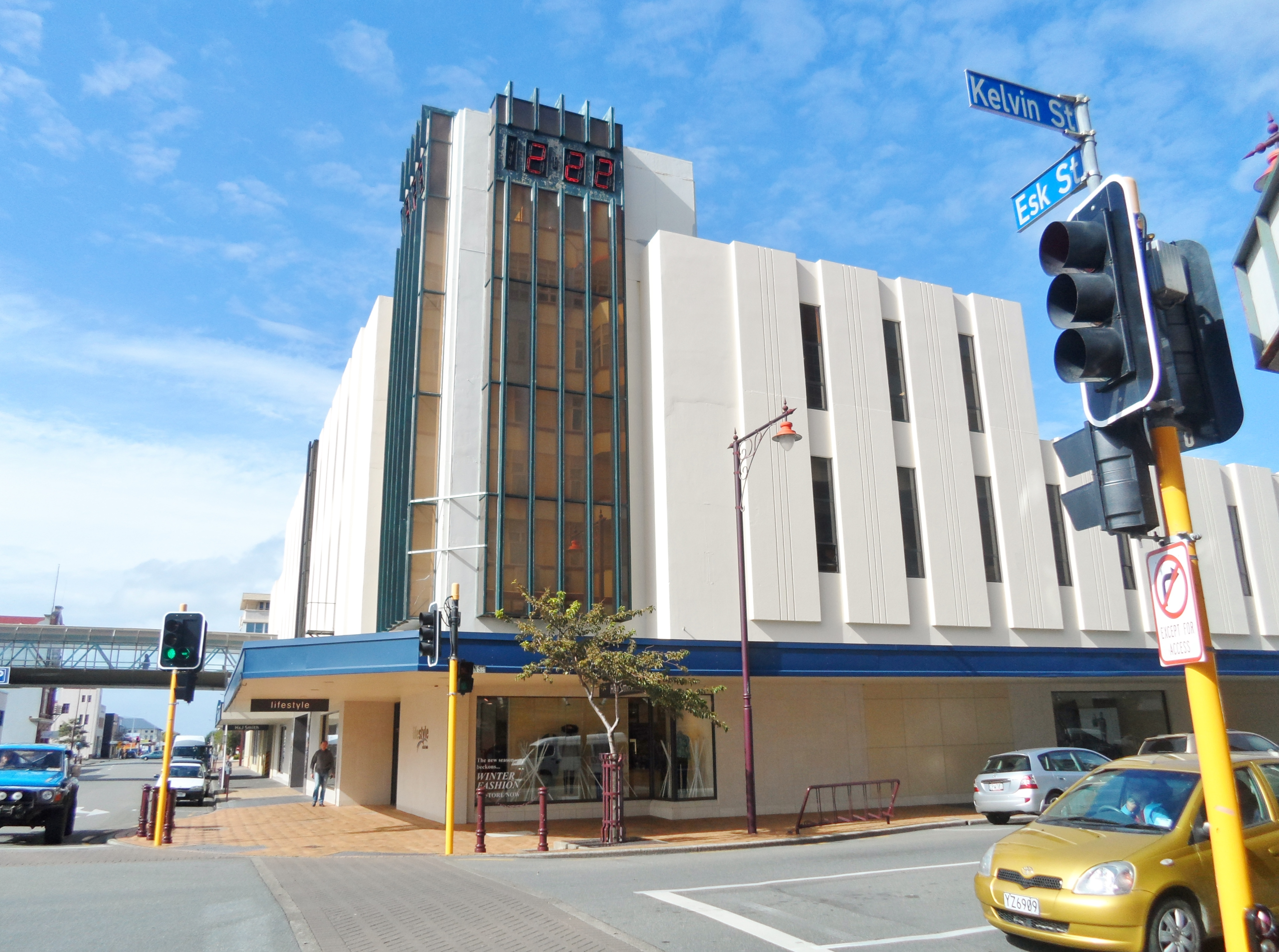
Clock tower of H & J Smith Invercargill, on the corner of Kelvin Street and Esk Street

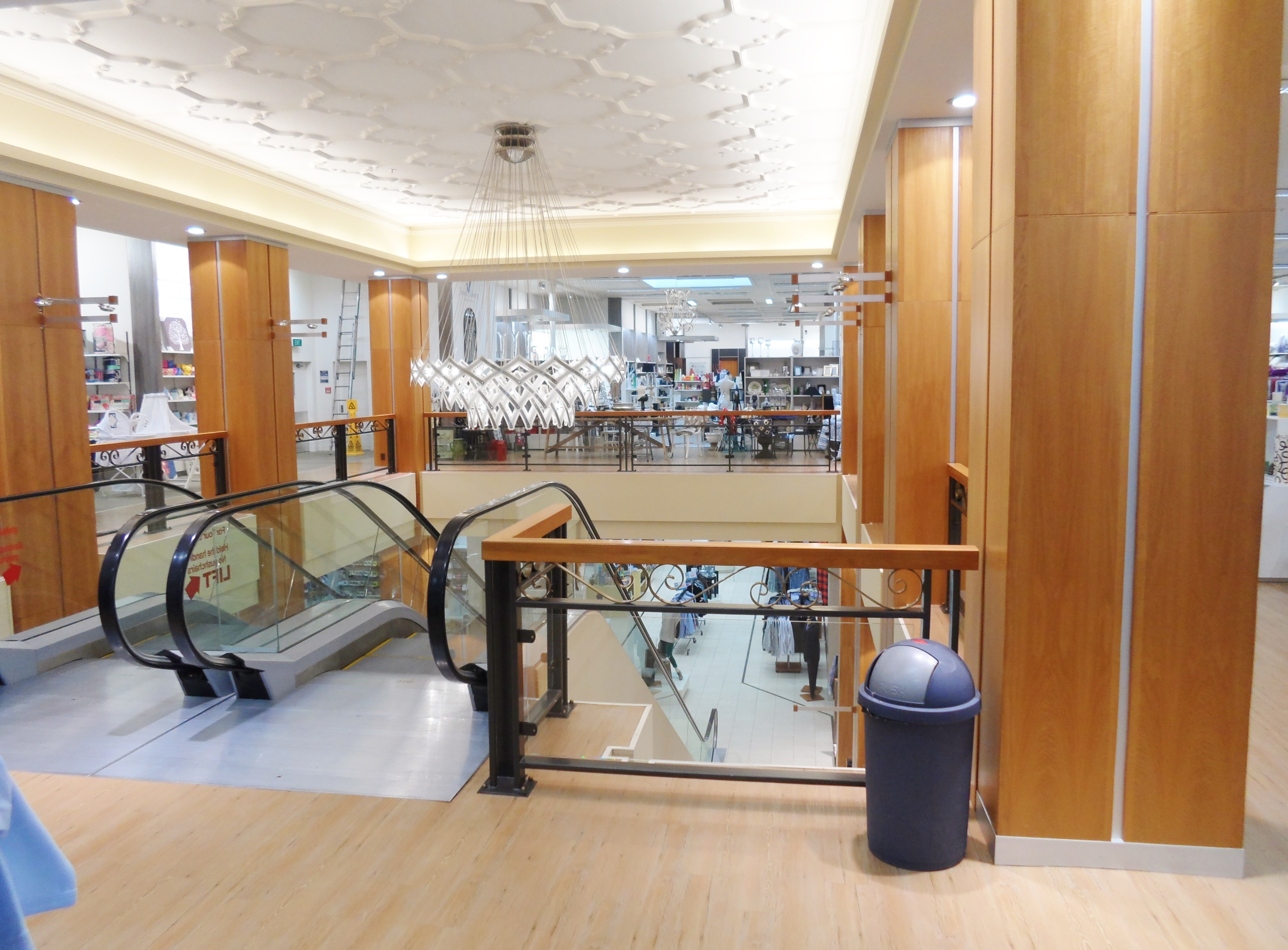
Escalator in H & J Smith Invercargill

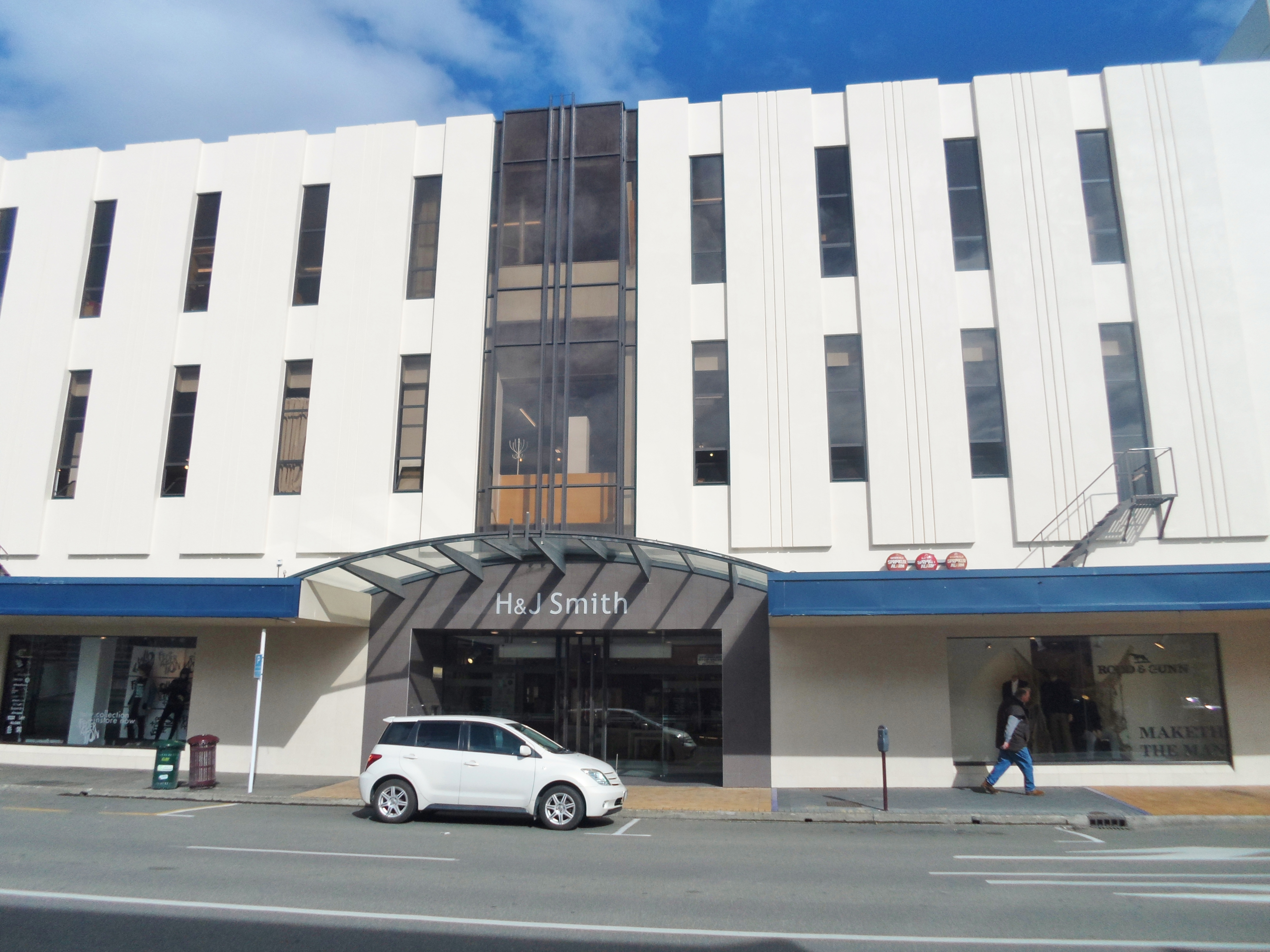
Esk Street facade of H & J Smith Invercargill

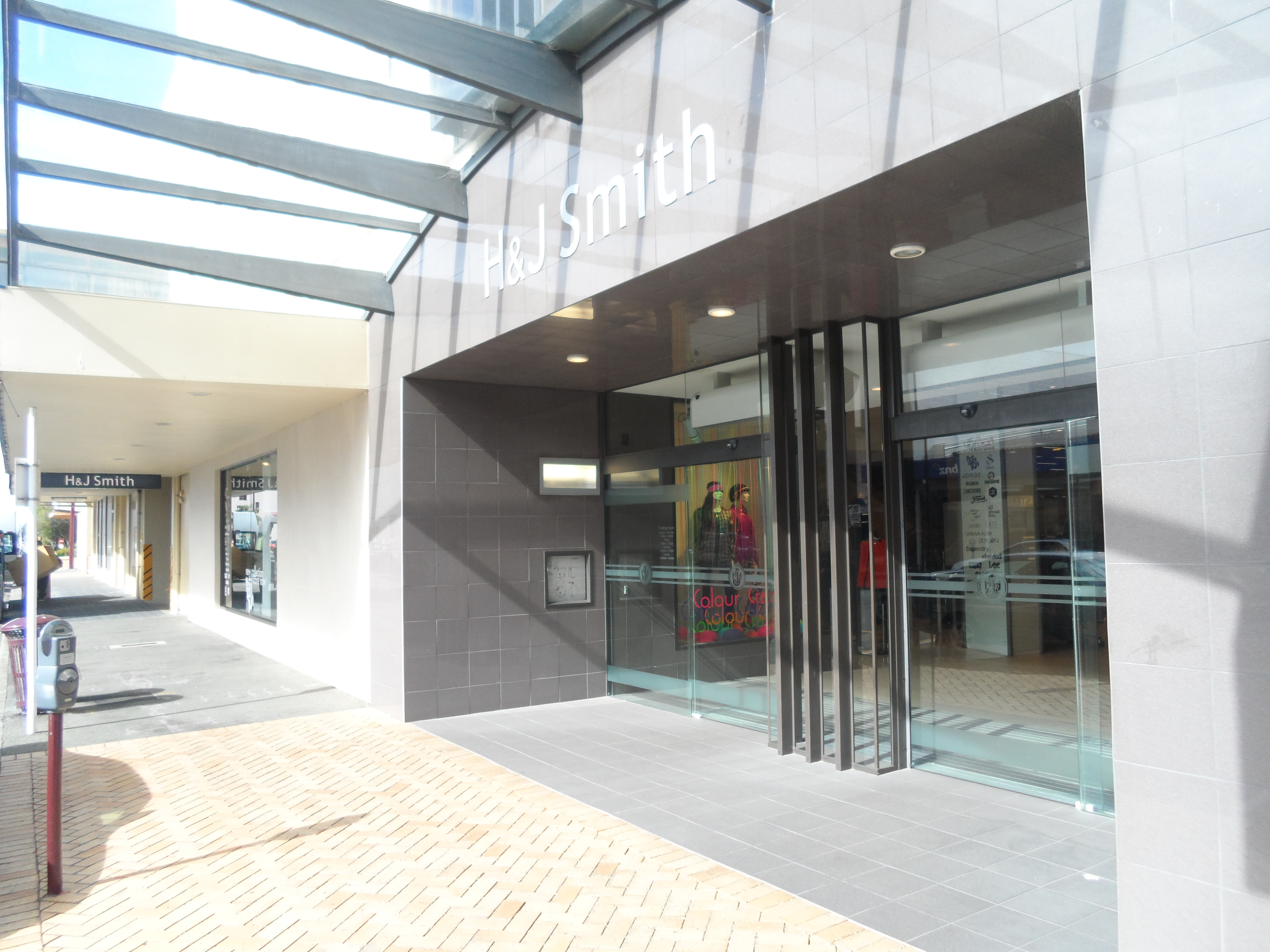
H & J Smith Invercargill main entrance

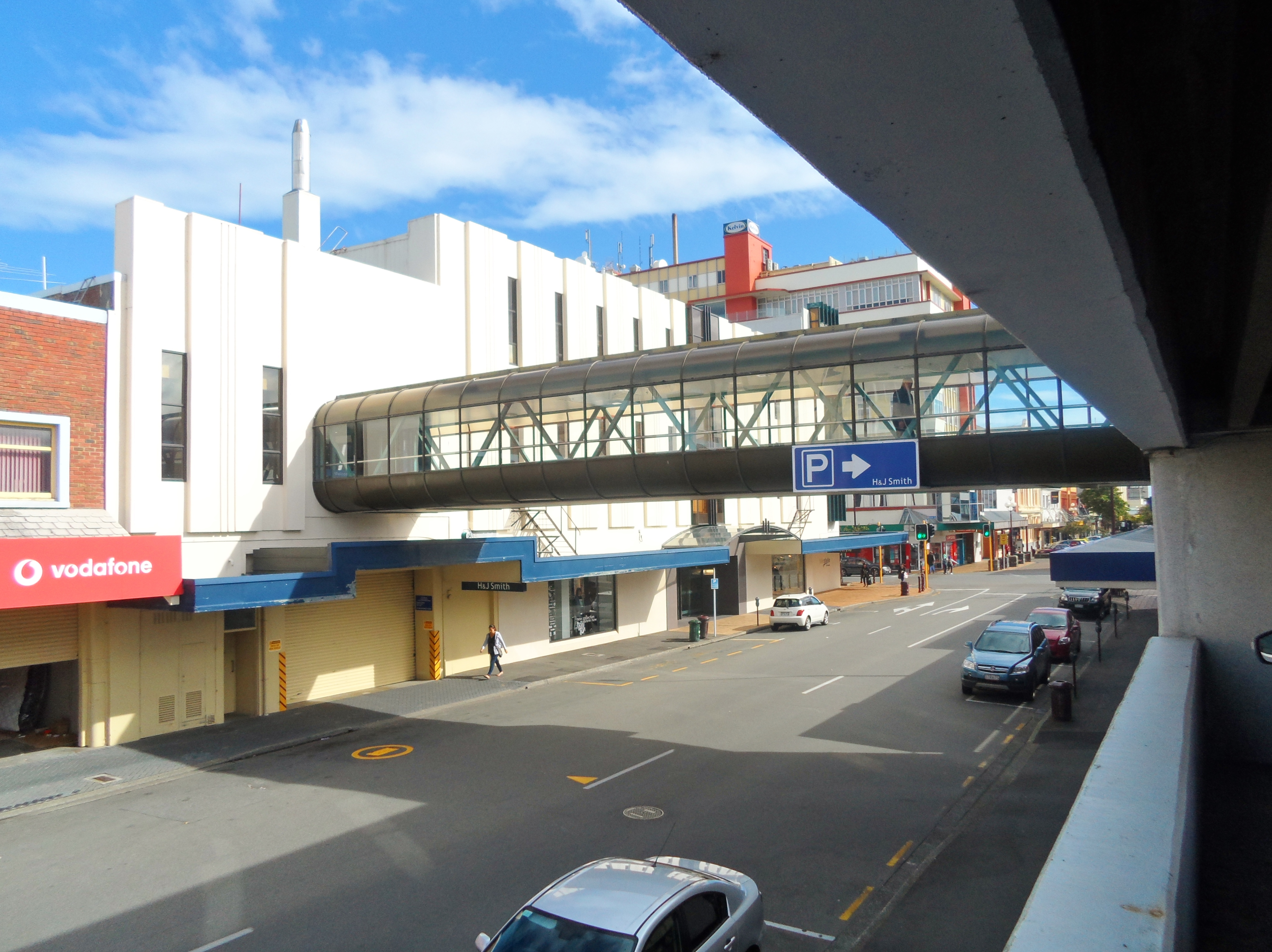
Sky Bridge at H & J Smith Invercargill across Esk Street

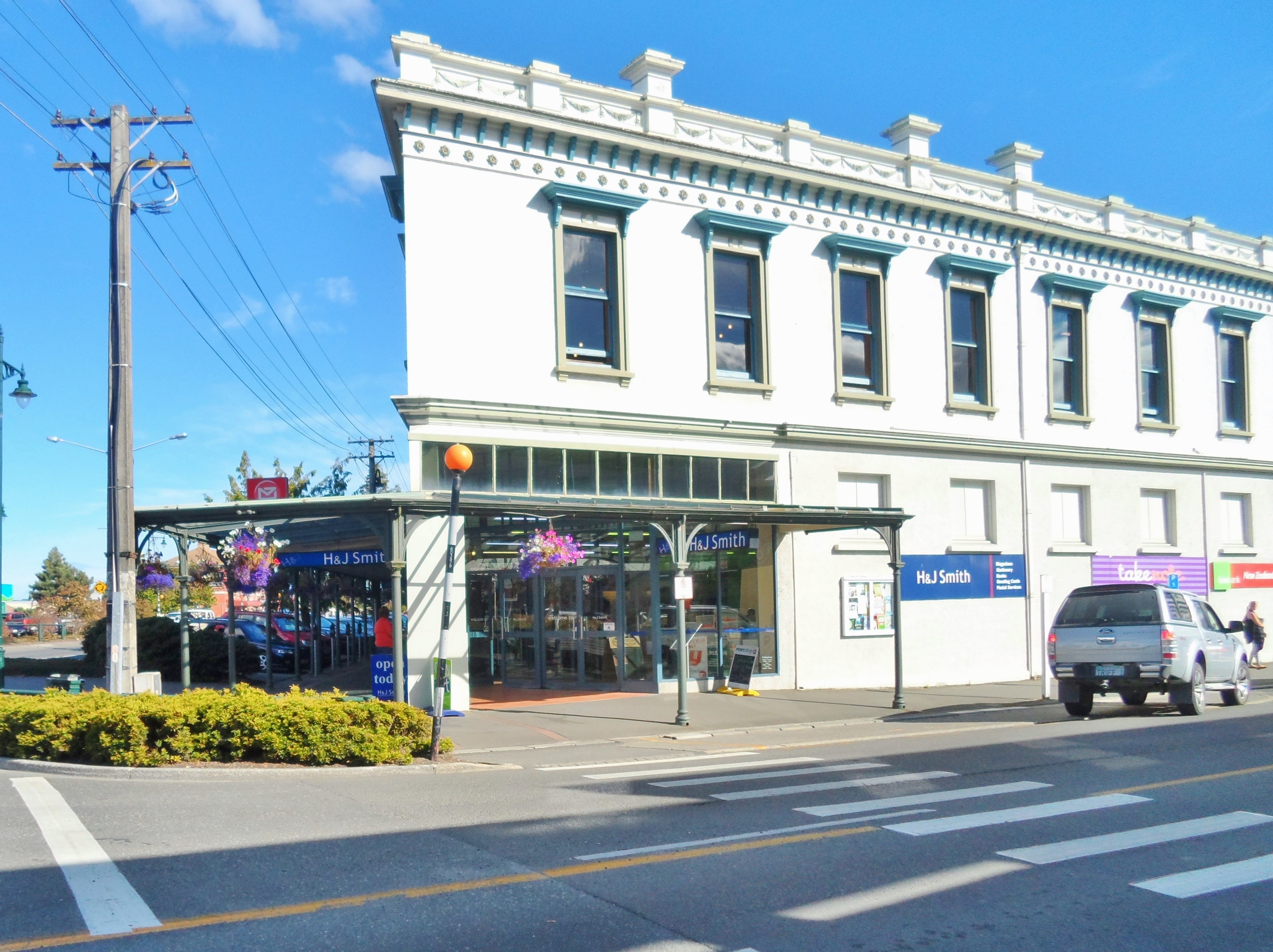
H & J Smith Gore main entrance

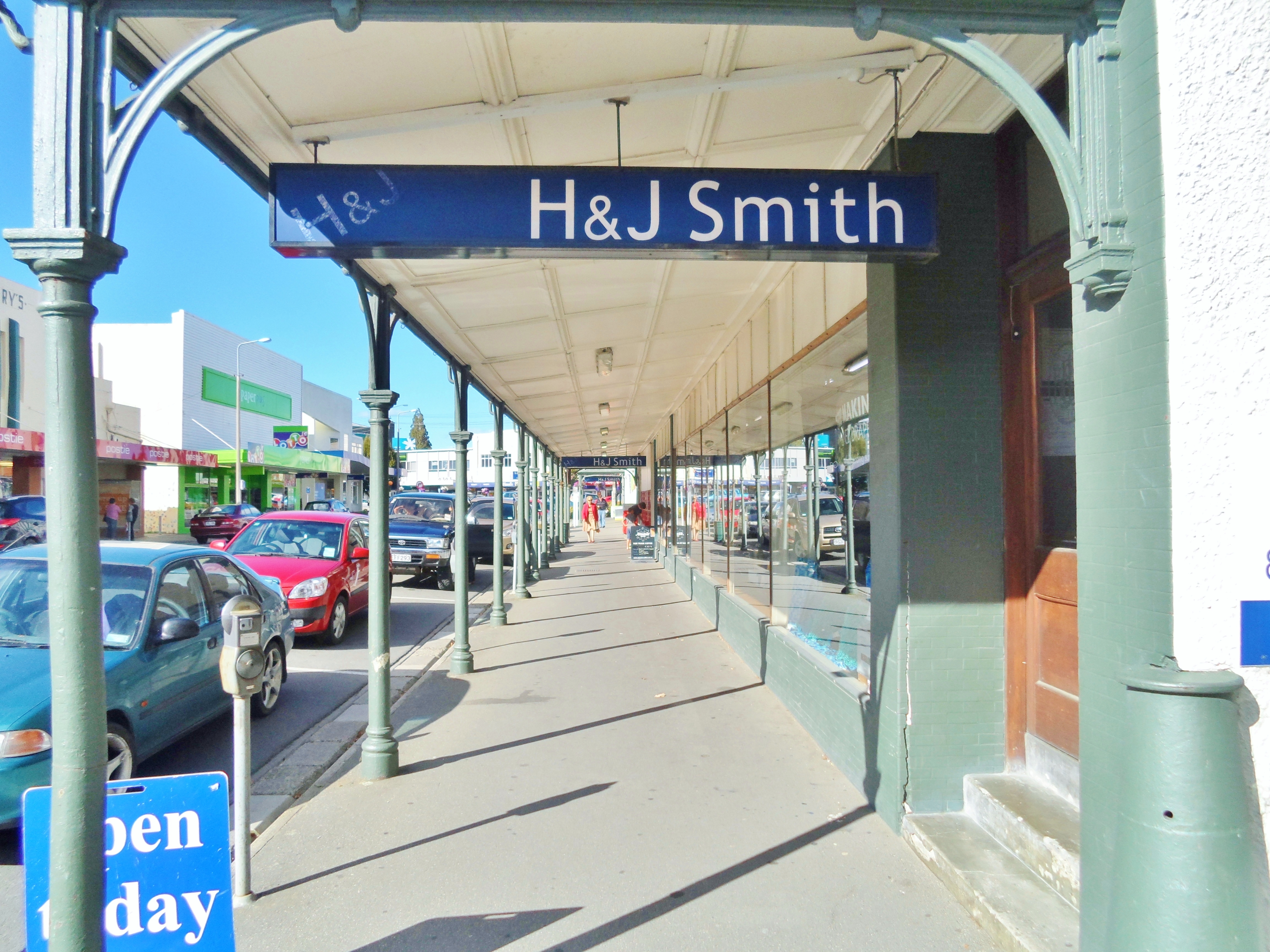
H & J Smith Gore side

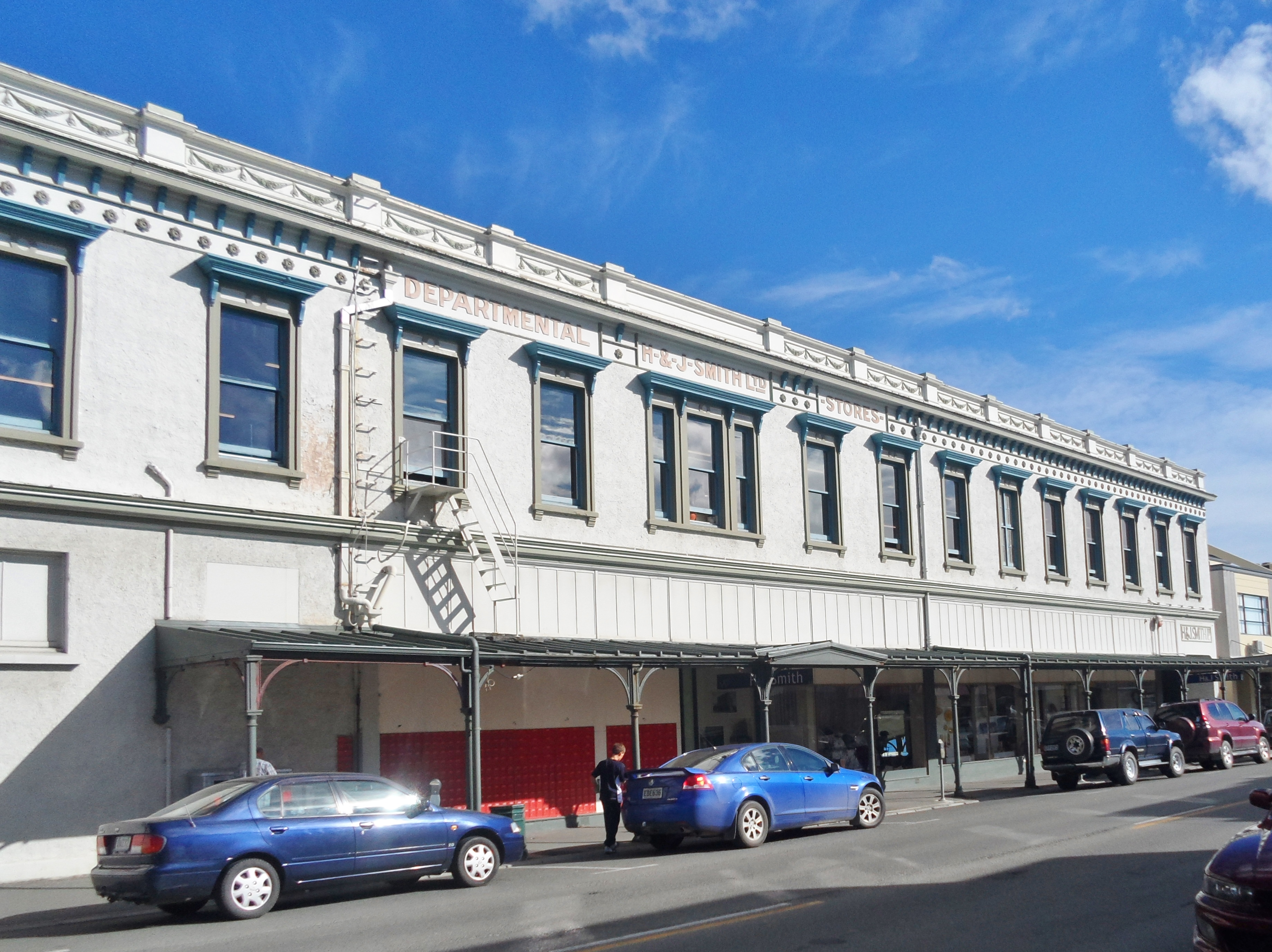
Irk Street side of H & J Smith Gore

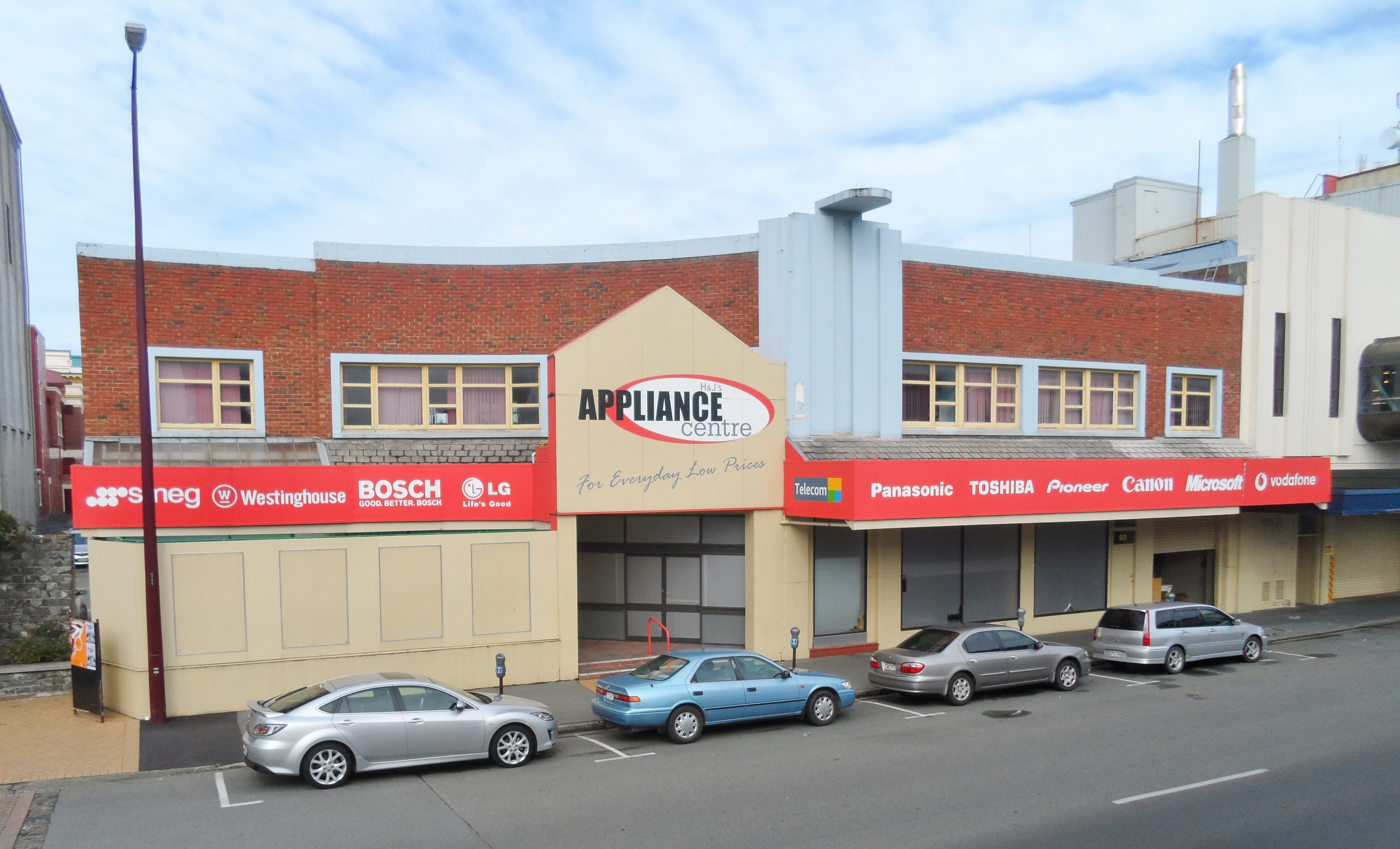
H & J's former Appliance Centre and Executive Offices in Invercargill, demolished in July 2013
