= Helen Hay Smith =

New Zealand clothing manufacturer and retailer, businesswoman (1873–1918)

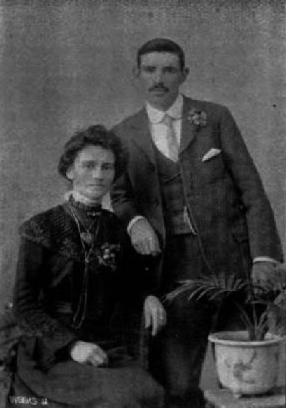
Helen and John Smith, co-founders of H & J Smith

Helen Hay Smith (29 August 1873 – 17 November 1918) was a notable New Zealand clothing manufacturer, retailer and businesswoman. She was born in McMaster's Flat, Central Otago, New Zealand, in 1873. She and her brother John co-founded the H & J Smith department store franchise.
