= Anchor tenant =

Larger tenant in a shopping mall

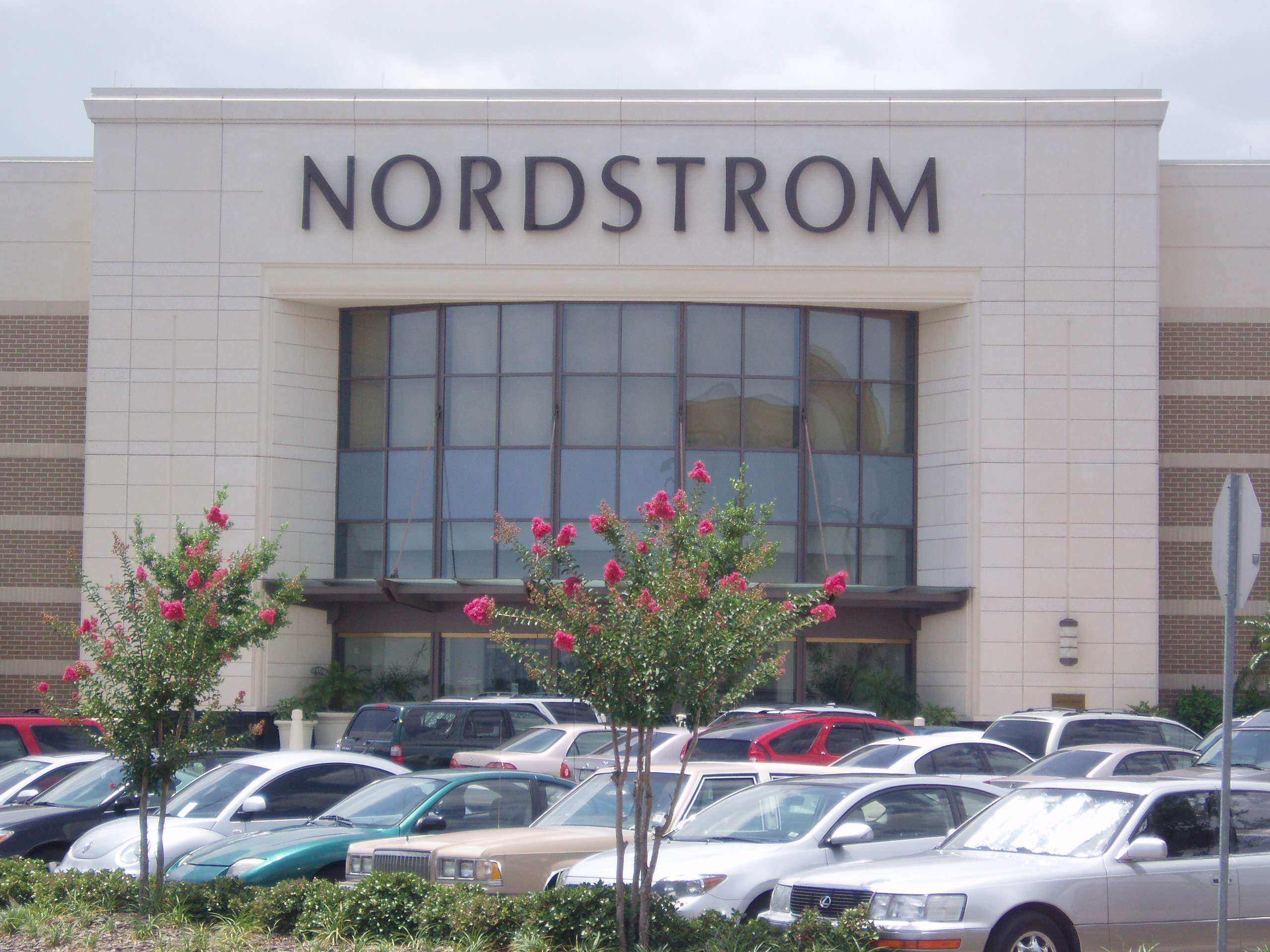
Nordstrom, a former anchor store at The Florida Mall located in Orlando, Florida

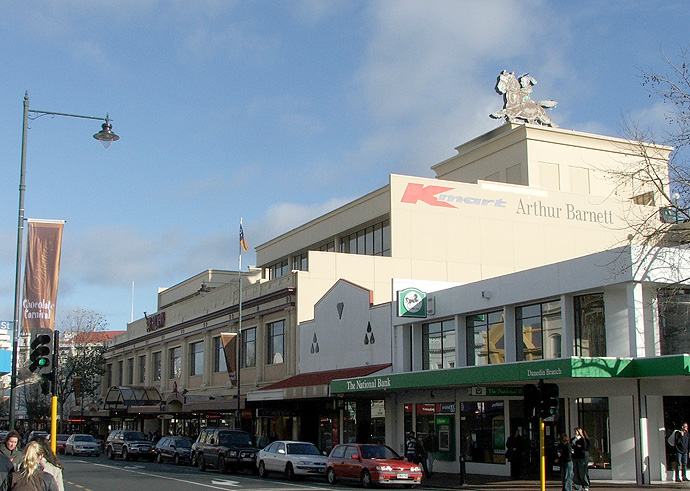
Meridian Mall in Dunedin, New Zealand, with the logos of the two anchor tenants (Kmart New Zealand and Arthur Barnett) displayed on the upper walls

In North American, Ireland, United Kingdom, Australian and New Zealand retail, an anchor tenant, sometimes called an anchor store, draw tenant, or key tenant, is a considerably larger tenant in a shopping mall, often a department store or retail chain. They are typically located at the ends of malls, sometimes in the middle. With their broad appeal, they are intended to attract a significant cross-section of the shopping public to the center. Often, these plots are offered steep discounts on rent in exchange for signing long-term leases in order to provide steady cash flows for the mall owners and attract passing trade to smaller tenants.

Some examples of anchor tenants in the United Kingdom are John Lewis & Partners, Marks and Spencer, Next, Primark, House of Fraser and Selfridges in fashion-oriented shopping centers. In the United States, these could be Macy's, Sears, JCPenney, Nordstrom, Bloomingdale's, Neiman Marcus, Saks Fifth Avenue, Dick's Sporting Goods, Dillard's, Kohl's, Walmart, and Target. Canadian examples are Nordstrom, TJX Canada (HomeSense, Winners, Marshalls), Walmart, Saks Fifth Avenue, and Sporting Life. Anchor stores that left Canada include Zellers, Hudson's Bay, Nordstrom Rack, Sears, and Target.

== Origins ==
When the planned shopping centre format was developed by Victor Gruen in the early to mid-1950s, signing larger department stores was necessary for the financial stability of the projects, and to draw retail traffic that would result in visits to the smaller shops in the centre as well. Anchors generally have their rents heavily discounted, and may even receive cash inducements from the centre to remain open.

Early on, grocery stores were a common type of anchor store, since they are visited often. However, research on consumer behaviour revealed that most trips to the supermarket did not result in visits to surrounding shops. Large supermarkets remain common anchor stores within retail parks and power centres, however.

Since the end of the 20th century, the declining popularity of old-line department stores has made it necessary for mall management companies to consider re-anchoring with other retail alternatives, or mix commercial development with residential development to guarantee a captive clientele.

The challenges faced by the traditional large department stores have led to a resurgence in the use of supermarkets, even gyms, as anchors.

== Classification ==
The International Council of Shopping Centers makes the presence of anchors one of the main defining characteristics of the two largest categories of centers, the regional center with 400,000 to 800,000 square feet (74,000 m^{2}) in gross leasable area, and the superregional center with more than 800,000 square feet (74,000 m^{2}) of space.

The regional center typically has two or more anchors, while the superregional typically has three or more.

In each case, the anchors account for 50–70% of the centre's leasable space.

== Culture ==
Shopping centers with anchor stores have consistently outperformed those without one, as the anchor helps draw shoppers initially attracted to the anchor to shop at other shops in the mall. Thus, a mall which loses its last anchor is often considered to be a dead mall.

== See also ==
- Shopping centre
- Supermarket
