= Arthur Barnett (businessman) =

New Zealand businessman (1873–1959)

Arthur Barnett OBE
- Born: 29 January 1873; Dunedin, New Zealand
- Died: 10 February 1959 (aged 86); Dunedin, New Zealand
- Occupation: retailer
- Known for: Arthur Barnett (department store)
- Relatives: Matthew Barnett (brother)

Arthur Barnett OBE (29 January 1873 – 10 February 1959) was a New Zealand businessman, and founder of the Arthur Barnett chain of department stores, the leading department store in Otago.

== Early life ==
Born in Dunedin on 29 January 1873, Barnett was the son of William Barnett, an auctioneer, and one of eleven children. Among his siblings was Matthew Barnett. He attended Albany Street School and Otago Boys' High School, leaving after his fourth-form year. He became an apprentice draper, working for A. & T. Inglis and later Fyfe & Cummings. At the latter firm he met his future wife Ethel Frances Reid. They married at St. Paul's Cathedral on 31 October 1900.

== Professional life ==
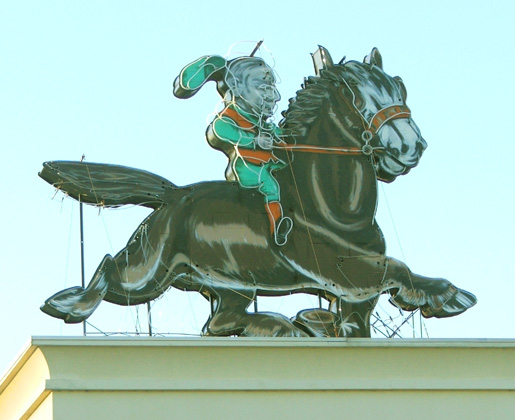
"Can't Stop", the advertising sign for the department store with the rider representing Arthur Barnett

In 1903, Barnett opened a small shop in George Street, Dunedin. His brother Matthew, a successful bookmaker in Christchurch, guaranteed a £900 loan to get the business going. His shop grew, largely on the strength of Barnett's skills at advertising his business. Within ten years, he had moved to larger premises and annexed two adjacent shops to create one of the South Island's largest stores. Around the same time, he trademarked an image of himself as a small jockey sitting astride a galloping Clydesdale horse (nicknamed "Can't stop") as a logo for his store. Eventually, the business was the leading department store in Otago.

Barnett's public profile rose alongside that of his business, and during World War I he put his skills to fundraising, with carnivals and parades which amassed many thousands of pounds. He also played a leading role in the New Zealand and South Seas Exhibition of 1925. By this time his business occupied half a city block and had a staff of around 100.

Barnett continued to organise public and charity events, overseeing a picnic for 10,000 children as part of the 1940 celebrations for the New Zealand Centennial and raising funds for the World War II war effort. The latter included organising a major funds drive for the Royal New Zealand Returned and Services' Association which saw him made an honorary life member of the organisation. He was also involved in organising for the Otago centennial in 1948.

Barnett's efforts both as an entrepreneur and a philanthropist saw him appointed an Officer of the Order of the British Empire in the 1951 New Year Honours. His wife, Ethel Barnett died on 2 July 1951. She was cremated the following day. After the death of his wife the same year as his OBE, he gradually withdrew from active life, leaving the store in the hands of his sons Jeffrey and Arthur, Jr.

== Home ==
Barnett built and resided at 211 Highgate. Originally addressed 79 Highgate, Section 11, Sunnyside. The grand property was built across 1918 and 1919. The construction was carried out by Fletcher Bros Ltd. Barnett lived at the property for two decades with a significnat alteration to the house being completed in 1929. This removed the downstairs nursery and converted it into a grand marble entrance into the house which opened into a sizeable hallway. The Hocken holds photos and architect plans for the alterations.

From 1938 Barnett resided at 34 Alva Street in Mornington, Dunedin. Today the mock-Tudor Barnett Lodge is available as a bed & breakfast.

== Death ==
Barnett died on 10 February 1959 aged 86 years after suffering a stroke earlier in the year at his beach house in Warrington. He was cremated two days later.
