= Arthur Barnett (department store) =

New Zealand department store

Arthur Barnett Ltd
- Absolute Service and Value Absolutely Arthur Barnett, Absolutely Right (radio)
- Type: Private (previously Public)
- Industry: Retail
- Founded: 1903; 123 years ago
- Defunct: 2015; 11 years ago
- Headquarters: Dunedin, New Zealand
- Key people: Sue Smaill, last general manager Michael Coburn, director Nicholas Scott, director Trevor Scott, director Julian Smith, director
- Products: apparel, cosmetics, accessories, homeware, furniture, general merchandise
- Website: arthurbarnett.co.nz

Arthur Barnett Ltd, trading as Arthur Barnett and often referred to as Arthur Barnett's, was a department store in Dunedin, New Zealand. Established in 1903 by Arthur Barnett the store first began as a drapery for men and boys, progressing over the years to become one of Dunedin's most successful department stores. As well as their flagship George Street store, Arthur Barnett had stores in Balclutha, Alexandra, Oamaru, and Christchurch. They also briefly had a branch in Melbourne which operated from 1970 to 1977. This branch sold mainly carpeting and furniture. The final Arthur Barnett store (on site of its first on George Street in Dunedin) and its online store was taken over by Invercargill-based department store chain H & J Smith in 2015.

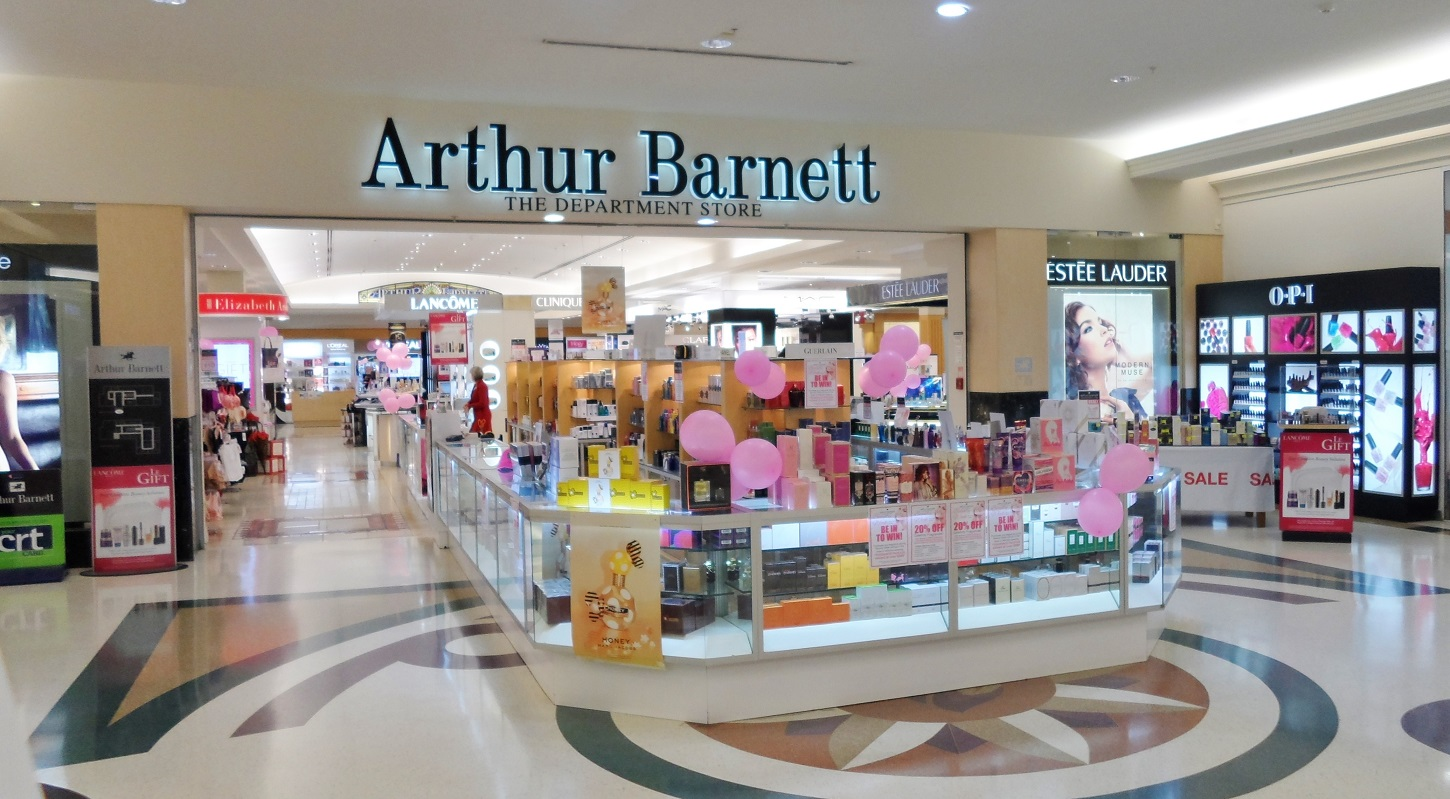
Arthur Barnett as it appeared until the takeover by H & J Smith

== History ==
Arthur Barnett opened his first drapery store in 1903, placing his first newspaper advertisement on 6 March of that year, and opening the next day. During this time his store became famous for its advertisements which were colourful and often relied heavily on gimmicks, such as naming a hat the 'King Dick' after the Prime Minister at the time Richard Seddon. Jim Sullivan argues that "Arthur Barnett's reputation for innovation in retail was becoming well-established – he had a flair and brought colour and a touch of the side show to what was a staid occupation."

New buildings followed in 1909 and 1924. The 1924 Arthur Barnett building designed by Edmund Anscombe was a landmark on the northern part of George Street, Dunedin. It was devastated by fire in 1959, with only the building shell and one major stained glass window surviving. It was rebuilt in 1960s modernist style behind the existing facades, the main retail floor being a soaring glass-roofed structure, inspiring the store's slogan of that era: "the Daylight Store." This was demolished progressively in 1995-7 and replaced by the Meridian Mall incorporating a reduced-size Arthur Barnett store across two levels.

=== D.I.C. takeover ===
Arthur Barnett took over the ailing DIC department store company in the 1980s. The D.I.C. had stores throughout New Zealand and should have proven a good geographical match for Arthur Barnett. In particular, the D.I.C. had 4 stores in the Auckland market, New Zealand's biggest. In December 1987, Arthur Barnett bought the trading assets of the three South Island stores and 50% of the 13 North Island stores which were run as a joint venture with Brierley Investments Ltd. Arthur Barnett Ltd bought the 16 D.I.C. stores outright in July 1988. The D.I.C. Stores were in Invercargill, Dunedin, Christchurch, Lower Hutt, Palmerston North, Wanganui, Hastings, Napier, Gisborne, Rotorua, Hamilton, Pakuranga, Henderson, Karangahape Road (Auckland), Takapuna, and Whangārei.

At its peak Arthur Barnett Ltd had over 1200 staff and 19 stores (the 16 former D.I.C. stores, along with its own branches in Alexandra, Balclutha, and Dunedin). However, the merger did not work well and all D.I.C. stores with the exception of Christchurch were closed within 2 years. By 1992 the majority of The D.I.C. assets were disposed of and the company was able to concentrate on its stores in Dunedin, Alexandra, Balclutha and Christchurch. In 1987 the Christchurch store in the Beaths Department Store Building was re-branded as Arthur Barnett and refurbished within the High Street Mall development in the city's centre. The Alexandra and Balclutha stores were closed in 1995 and 2001 respectively. The Balclutha store was taken over by rival Invercargill-based department store chain H & J Smith. The D.I.C. debacle cost Arthur Barnett around $NZ 20 million and as a result the company had to borrow heavily to help finance the Meridian Mall project in 1995.

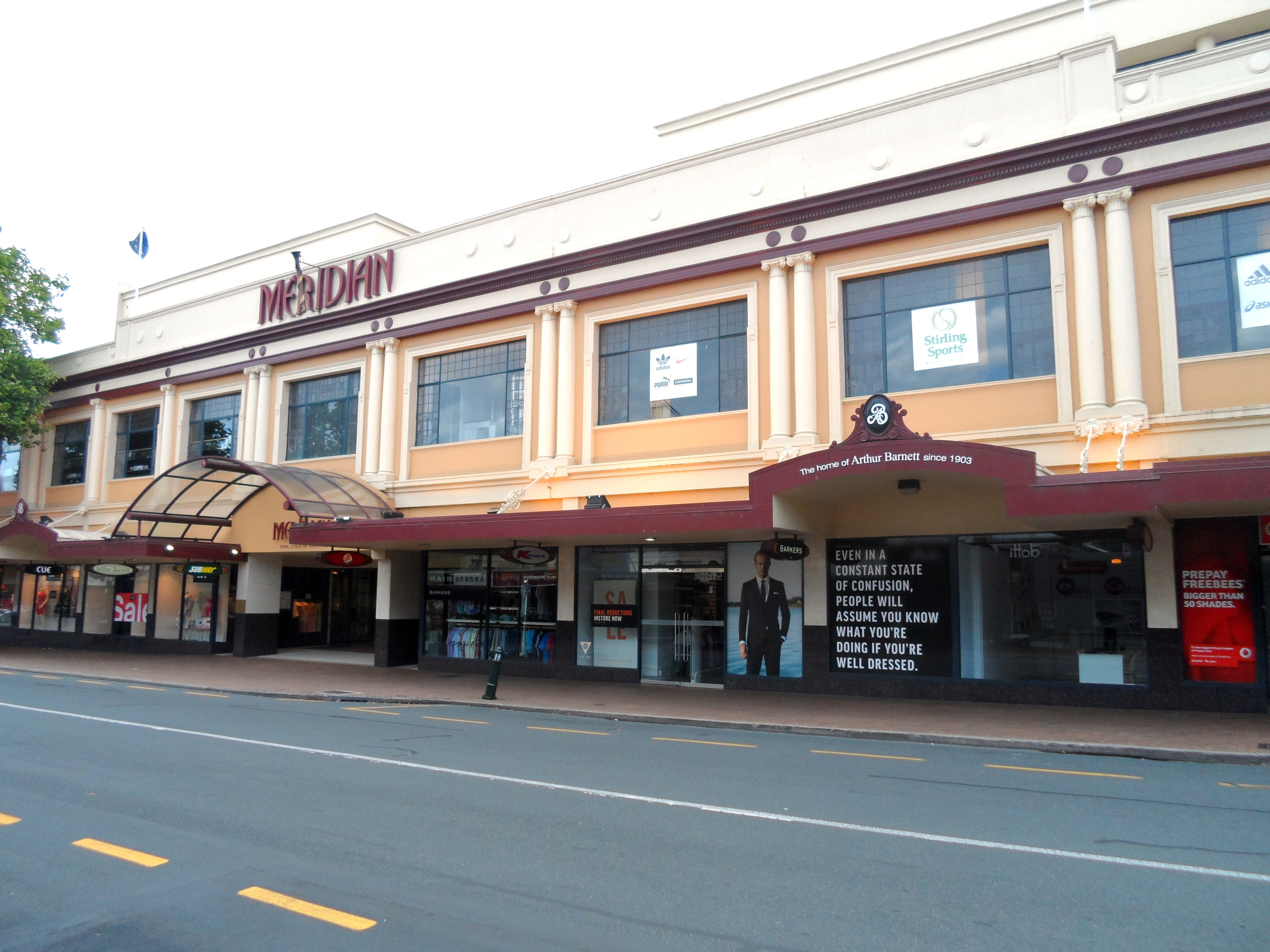
Arthur Barnett is located at 285 George Street, The Meridian Mall

=== Meridian Mall and a single store ===
The Meridian Mall opened on 5 September 1997 with the final development costs close to $NZ 50 million. As the primary anchor tenant, Arthur Barnett had the greatest floor space, spread across two levels, although this being only about half that of the old store. The main and lower floors are linked by escalators, with a more upmarket appearance than previous Arthur Barnett stores.

The Meridian building was sold in 2003, with the proceeds used to retire debt. Finally in February 2006, the Christchurch store was closed. Many of the staff were able to be relocated to other retailers including Farmers and Ballantynes. From then on, the company only operated a single store, which acted as Otago's luxury department store, specialising in cosmetics, fashion, homeware and school uniforms.

=== Recent ventures ===
In mid-2011, a small Arthur Barnett outlet store was opened in Christchurch's Hornby Dress Smart discount shopping centre, following the Christchurch earthquakes. The temporary store was closed in 2012.

Also in 2011, Arthur Barnett opened the 'Arthur Barnett Gift Shop' at the front of the Meridian, in the former Kimberleys store. The 'Gift Shop' was later changed to a 'Clearance Shop', and was closed by 2012. Mid November 2012 saw the opening of a temporary cosmetics clearance shop in the upper level of the Meridian.

During OUSA Orientation Week ('O Week') in March, the company operated a branded marquee at the University of Otago. The kiosk, staffed by two Clinique beauty consultants, promoted the store and Beauty department to new students. The marquee did not appear after 2012.

The former Arthur Barnett logo, used until 2013

In late 2012, Arthur Barnett began using a redesigned logo in their advertising. The new logo uses a lower case sans serif font, with a capitalised subtitle 'the department store'. Absolutely Arthur Barnett, Absolutely Right is still used on radio advertising. Early 2013 saw the company launch online shopping.

On 16 April 2013 Arthur Barnett held an event 'Fashion and Food with Peta Mathias' hosted by celebrity Peta Mathias at the recently reopened Toitū Otago Settlers Museum. Janine Tindall-Morice commented "This event signals Arthur Barnett's desire to engage with our female customers in a fresh and dynamic new way." In August 2013, the store launched a loyalty programme, 'Arthur Barnett REWARDS'.

The company followed up their Peta Mathias-hosted event in October with 'Fashion in the Chapel' hosted by model Rachel Hunter at the John McGlashan College chapel. The event launched the store's spring and summer fashion collections.

=== Sale to H & J Smith ===
Arthur Barnett sold their final store to Southland department store H & J Smith in June 2015. The Dunedin store continued to trade with the Arthur Barnett name until late in 2015 and was then rebranded as H & J Smith ending 112 years of the Arthur Barnett brand. In May 2020 as a result of the COVID-19 pandemic in New Zealand a proposal was put forward to close several of H & J Smith's stores, this included the Dunedin department store, Balclutha (which had previously operated as an Arthur Barnett store), Te Anau and the Queenstown Outdoor World store. Confirmation of the Dunedin store was made in June 2020 and the H & J Smith Dunedin store closed on 30 January 2021.

== Branch stores ==
- Christchurch, 119 Cashel Street (operating from 1926 to 1935)
- Balclutha (operating from 1955 to 2001)
- Oamaru (operating from 1963 to 1969)
- Melbourne (Australia), Gardenvale (operating from 1970 to 197?)
- Melbourne (Australia), Frankston (operating from 1971 to 1977)
- Alexandra (operating from 1966 to 1996)
- Christchurch, Corner of Cashel Street and Colombo Street (operating from 1988 to 2006)

== Departments ==
Arthur Barnett held 14 departments across the ground and lower floors of the Meridian. Departments include Beauty; Lingerie; Men's Fashion (or Menswear); Women's Fashion (or Ladies' Wear); Lifestyle Apparel, Accessories (& Hosiery); Children's Fashion; Luggage; Casual Living (or Homeware), from late 2011 with dedicated concept areas for Citta Design and French Country; Home Linens; Small appliances; Furnishings; and Schoolwear. Additionally, Reception and the Arthur Barnett Café were located on the lower level. Within the Home Linens department is the Wallace Cotton 'concession'.

=== Beauty ===
The well-established Beauty department was the largest and most comprehensive south of Christchurch. Makeup and skincare are available at serviced cosmetics counters for M·A·C, Yves Saint Laurent, and most recently, Jurlique (exclusive in the South Island), all exclusive to Arthur Barnett in Otago and Southland. The Fine Fragrance counter is the largest in Dunedin. Arthur Barnett formerly housed Dunedin's only Smashbox counter. In early-mid-2009, Smashbox was relocated to new rival Life Pharmacy, in the new Wall Street Mall nearby. Other former beauty counters include Christian Dior, and, until the brand's withdrawal from the New Zealand market in mid-2009, Origins.

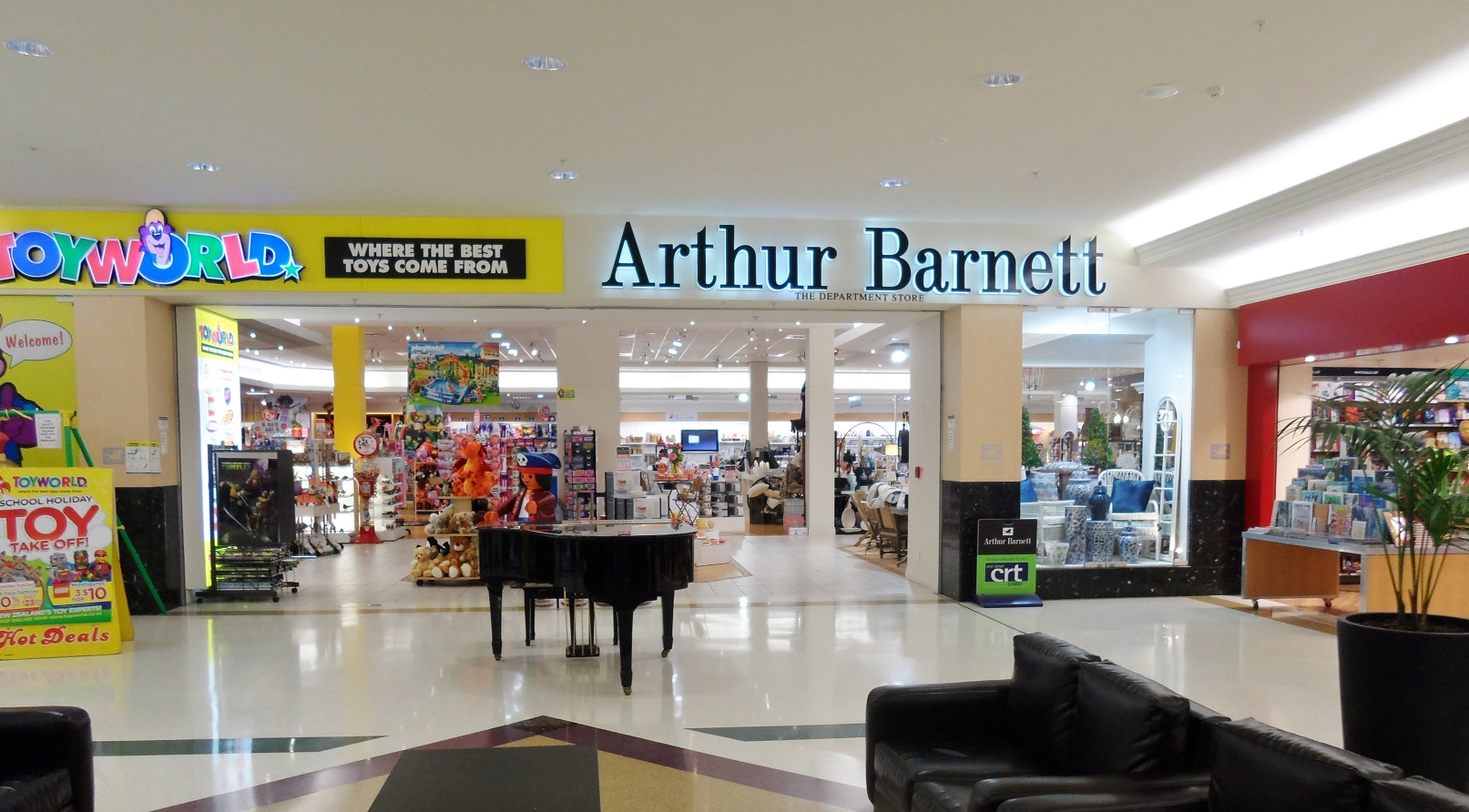
Arthur Barnett Lower Level entrance circa 2014

=== Former departments ===
Former departments include Electronics and Large Appliances/Whiteware featuring Fisher & Paykel. From 2007, these departments were branded as the 'store-within-a-store', '100% Arthur Barnett' under the New Zealand 100% Electrical franchise. 100% and its product areas were removed in mid-2010, with only Small Appliances retained as an independent department. Also in 2007, space was made within the Casual Living department for the nest [sic] homeware concept store as a separate 'store-within-a-store'. The entire nest [sic] franchise collapsed into receivership in October 2010. In mid-2010, the lower level of the Meridian Mall was reconfigured, considerably decreasing the store's floor space in what was originally its own mall.

=== "Can't stop" ===
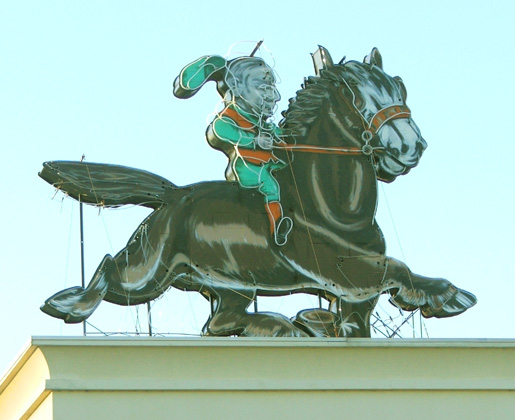
"Can't Stop"

The advertising sign for Arthur Barnett is a prominent feature on the Dunedin skyline. Named Can't Stop, this neon sign features a small man (representing the firm's founder) trying to control a large horse, possibly a Clydesdale.

The sign was designed by the New Zealand artist Heber Thompson for the 1924 Arthur Barnett building (designed by Edmund Anscombe) which until 1995 stood on the site now occupied by the Meridian Mall. The sign still remains despite the change in ownership of the Meridian.

== Ownership ==
Arthur Barnett was listed on the New Zealand stock exchange until a NZ$9.5 million internal takeover by company directors Julian Smith and Trevor Scott took the company private in 2002 through their company Belwash Holdings Ltd.

== See also ==
- H & J Smith
- Smith & Caughey's
- Kirkcaldie & Stains
- Ballantynes
- Farmers
