= Meridian Mall, Dunedin =

Shopping complex in Dunedin, New Zealand

Meridian Mall
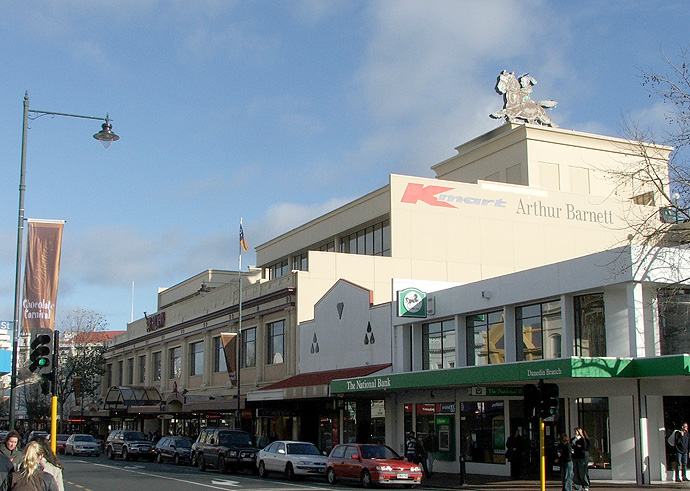
- The Meridian Mall, Dunedin
- Location: Dunedin, New Zealand
- Coordinates: 45.870°S 170.505°E
- Address: 267 George Street
- Opened: 4 September 1997
- Developer: Arthur Barnett Ltd
- Manager: Oyster Group
- Owner: Meridian Mall Ltd
- Architect: ASA Crone Architects
- Num. of stores: 53
- Num. of anchor tenants: 2
- Floors: 3

The Meridian Mall is a large shopping complex in Dunedin, New Zealand, designed by ASA Crone Architects, an Australian development company. At 16,000 m^{2} (172,222.6 sq ft) it is the largest retail mall in the southern South Island, and one of the largest in the South Island as a whole.

== History ==
The mall was constructed in 1995–1997 behind the former Arthur Barnett building in George Street which was designed by Edmund Anscombe (1874–1948) and completed in 1924. The new complex is a central retail hub, with JB Hi-Fi and Smiths City anchoring (there is space for another anchor and it was previously filled by H&J Smith). It opened on 5 September 1997 with the final development costs close to NZ$50 million. Arthur Barnett sold the mall to ING Real Estate Australia for $52.65 million in April 2003, using the proceeds to retire debt.

In 2010 it was purchased by Lend Lease Group (LLC) for $185 million, along with three Dress Smart outlets in Auckland, Wellington and Christchurch. In October 2011, Lend Lease sold the four shopping centres to its new Lend Lease Real Estate Partners New Zealand Fund for $NZ197 million.

The mall contains 50 shops spread over three levels, including a large food court on the lower level. Above these three levels is a multi-storey car park, office space and a doctor's office.

The neon advertising sign for Arthur Barnett that sat atop the mall was a prominent feature on the Dunedin skyline. Named Can't Stop, it featured a small man trying to control a large horse, possibly a Clydesdale. It was designed by the New Zealand artist Heber Thompson for the 1924 building. The historic neon sign was turned off in May 2016 "for maintenance" and is still inoperative as of January 2019.

In 2020, after anchoring the mall since its opening, K-mart closed due to "quake concerns"; they announced that they would be moving to the former Smiths City site for 4 years while they searched for a new location, but as of August 2022 they had still not moved to the old Smiths City site. When K-Mart left the Mall, Smiths City moved into the old K-mart location.

In 2021, the mall was sold to Meridian Mall Ltd.

== Golden Centre Mall and Wall Street Mall ==
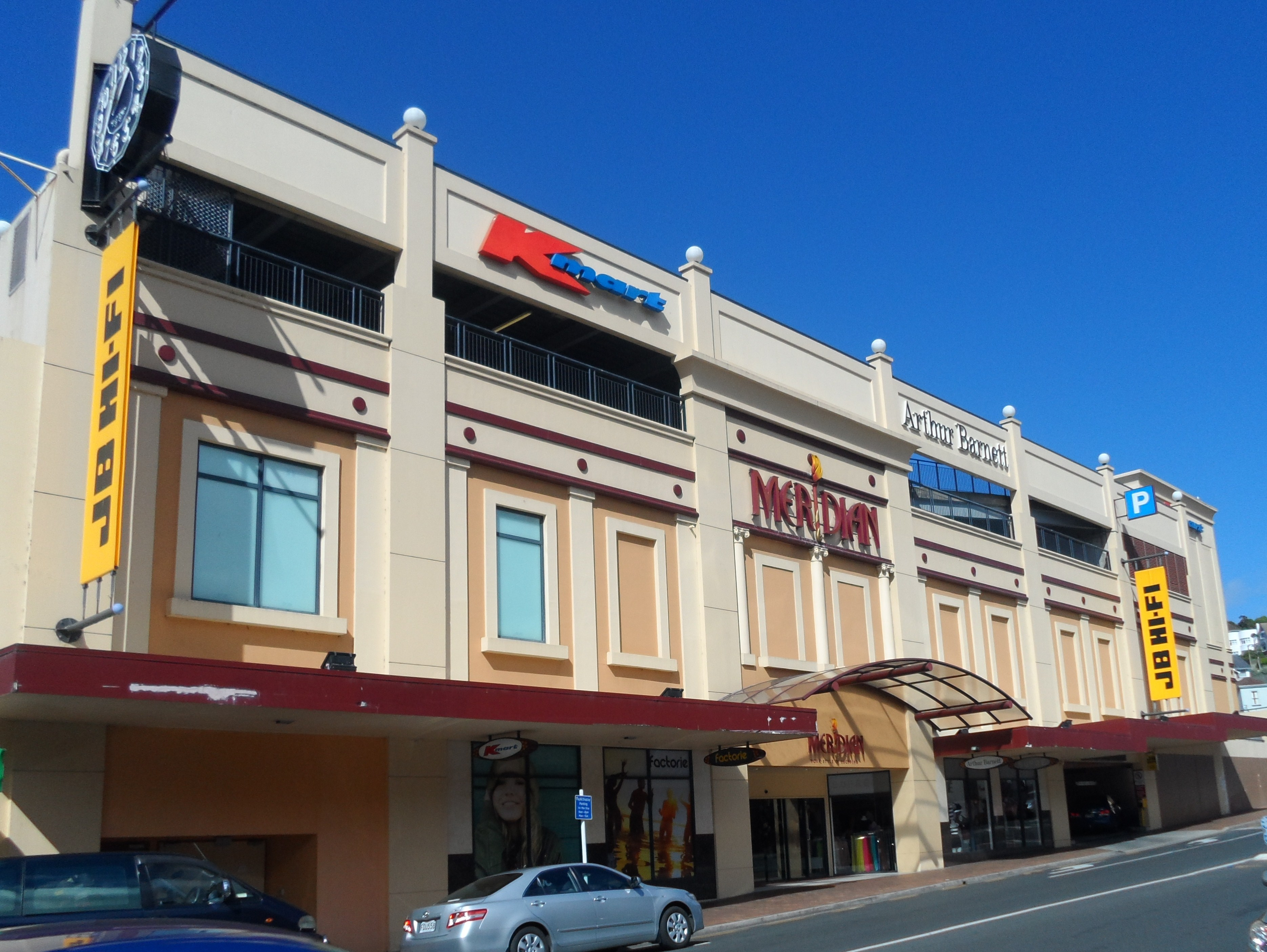
The Hanover Street facade of the mall

Lying immediately south of the Meridian Mall is the independently operated Golden Centre, which was one of Dunedin's first shopping malls.

Beyond the Golden Centre Mall lies the Wall Street Mall, which was opened on 21 March 2009. The Wall Street development was delayed by the discovery on the site of a corduroy causeway, one of Dunedin's earliest walkways. It dates from the 1850s, less than a decade after the city was founded. The walkway was preserved and reinterred under the Wall Street Mall in 2021. It is now visible through a transparent floor in the mall. The walkway has a Heritage New Zealand Category I status.

Renovation and expansion of the Golden Centre during 2009 resulted in the three malls being linked internally in November 2009. The three malls thus form one continuous complex occupying almost the entire two-hectare central city block, having a total floor area of over 28,000 m^{2} (6.9 acres).

== Parking ==
The Golden Centre and Meridian Malls' multi-storey car parks are linked, with entrance through the Meridian park and exit through the Golden Centre park. The Golden Centre's park is immediately behind the mall; the Meridian's park is on several floors on top of the mall.
