= Retailing in New Zealand =

Retailing in New Zealand is an important sector in the economy of New Zealand, as a channel for a large proportion of household spending and international visitor spending.

The overall size of the sector has been increasing since the end of the 1997 Asian financial crisis, with retail sales increasing by 30% between 1999 and 2005. One contributing factor was the growth of larger stores with greater buying power and economies of scale, at the cost of smaller bricks and mortar merchants. Another contributing factor was low price inflation, with the price of imported goods falling 12% during that period.

By 2004, about 15% of New Zealand businesses were retail outlets. These businesses accounted for 19% of total employment and 7.5% of the Gross Domestic Product with total sales of about $51 billion. Supermarket and grocery stores made up about 28% of non-auto sales and 16% of retail employees.

The beginning of the COVID-19 pandemic in New Zealand had a major impact on the retail sector. Sales dropped 15% in the June 2020 quarter before increasing 7.4% in the September 2020 quarter. The sector recovered faster than originally expected.

In 2021, BDO identified the key trends in the New Zealand retail sector to be rising staffing costs, increased online shopping, changing technology, and the need to improve efficiency without compromising customer experience.

== Supermarkets and grocery stores ==
Sales values in the sector increased from $8.3531 billion in 2000 to $22.5867 billion in 2021. The number of businesses increased from 2,679 to 3,525. The number of employees increased from 46,700 to 62,600.

=== Foodstuffs ===
- Four Square, established in 1925, has 224 stores.
- New World, established in 1963, has 142 stores.
- PAK'nSAVE, established in 1985, has 57 stores.
- New World Metro, established in 2002, has four stores.

=== Woolworths New Zealand ===
- Woolworths, established in 1929, and again 2023, has 184 stores.
- SuperValue, established in 1964, has 38 stores.
- FreshChoice, established in 1995, has 33 stores.
- Woolworths Metro, established in 2024, has four stores.

=== Independent ===
- Faro, established in 2006, has 7 stores, all in Auckland.
- Night 'n Day, established in 1984, has 51 stores.

== Hardware, building and garden supplies ==
Sales values in the sector increased from $3,575.4 million in 2000 to $9,754 million in 2021. The number of businesses declined from 1,542 to 1,401. The number of employees increased from 13,000 to 23,800.

=== Home decorating ===
- Resene ColorShop, established in Wellington CBD in 1975, has 60 stores.
- Guthrie Bowron, established in Christchurch CBD in 1932, has 50 stores.
- ColourPlus, a franchise established in 1999 in Hastings Central, has nine stores. This is down from 26 stores in 2016, and 40 stores in 1999.

=== Garden centres ===
- Palmers Garden Centre, established in Glen Eden, Auckland in 1912, has 12 stores.
- Kings Plant Barn, established in Takapuna, Auckland in 1992, has eight stores, all within Auckland.

== Fuel retailing ==
New Zealand has several petrol station chains and franchises which supply fuel for cars, motorbikes, trucks and boats.

The sector has undergone significant consolidation between 2000 and 2021. The number of businesses almost halved from 1,245 to 660. The number of employees also halved from 12,400 to 6,200.

Sales values in the sector increased from $3.4436 billion in 2000 to $7.642 billion in 2021. It reached a record high of $9.0095 billion in 2022.

=== Petrol stations ===
- Z Energy has 227 petrol stations. It traces its origins back to 1912.
- BP has 240 petrol stations. It began in 1946.
- Mobil New Zealand has 167 petrol stations. It was established in Wellington Central in 1896.
- GAS Petrol Service Stations has 127 petrol stations. It started in 1999.
- Gull New Zealand has 113 petrol stations. It started in Frankton, Hamilton in 1999.
- Challenge has 78 stations. It started in 1998.
- Waitomo has 70 stations. It was established in 1947.
- Allied Petroleum has 69 petrol stations. It began in Wigram, Christchurch in 1993.

== Pharmaceutical and other store based retailing ==
Sales values in the sector increased from $2,507.7 million in 2000 to $6,049.1 million in 2021.

The number of businesses has declined from 6,423 to 5,772. The number of employees increased from 19,000 to 23,600.

=== Pharmacies ===
- Chemist Warehouse is a franchise of 30 discount pharmacies; its first store opened in Glenfield, Auckland in 2017.
- Unichem is a franchise of 278 community pharmacies, launched in 1981.
- Life Pharmacy is a franchise of 65 upmarket pharmacies, launched in 1995.
- Health 2000 is a chain of dietary supplement stores established in 1993. It has 51 stores.

=== Variety ===
- Sunny's Variety Stores is a chain of five variety stores, established in Whangamatā in 1995.

== Department stores ==
Sales values in the sector increased from $2,556.1 million in 2000 to $5,774.6 million in 2021. The number of businesses decreased from 18 to 12. The number of employees has fluctuated from 18,700 to 19,700.

=== National chains ===
- The Warehouse has 89 stores. It is part of The Warehouse Group, and opened its first store in Takapuna, Auckland in 1982.
- Farmers has 59 stores. It is owned by James Pascoe Group and opened its first store in 1909.
- Harvey Norman has 44 stores. The first store opened in Wairau Valley, Auckland in 1997.
- Kmart has 21 stores. It is owned by Wesfarmers, and opened its first store in Henderson, Auckland in 1988.
- EziBuy has six stores. It was established in Palmerston North Central in 1978.

=== Regional department stores ===
- Ballantynes is a Christchurch-based chain of two department stores established in 1854.
- Smith & Caughey's, established in 1880, has a store in Auckland. Their second store in Newmarket, Auckland closed in 2024.
- David Jones has had a store in Newmarket, Auckland since 2019. It previously had a store in Wellington CBD between 2016 and 2022.

=== Defunct stores ===
- Arthur Barnett was established in Dunedin Central in 1903. It had five stores by 1992, but was taken over by H & J Smith in 2015.
- D.I.C. was established in Dunedin Central in 1884 and had 16 stores by 1988. It closed in 1992.
- H & J Smith was an Invercargill-based chain of three stores established in 1900 and closed in 2023.
- Kirkcaldie & Stains was established on Lambton Quay in Wellington CBD in 1863. It closed in 2016.
- DEKA was a chain of department stores established in 1988 through the rebranding of Woolworths and McKenzies stores. It had 61 stores in 2000. The stores were closed or rebranded as Farmers stores in 2001.

== Electrical and electronic goods retailing ==
Sales values in the sector increased from $1,385.4 million in 2000 to $4,626.2 million in 2021. The number of businesses increased from 1,029 to 1,269. The number of employees increased from 5,100 to 8,600.

=== Electronic goods ===
- Noel Leeming has 68 stores. The first store opened in Barrington, Christchurch in 1927.
- Lighting Direct, established in 1974, has 24 stores nationwide.
- Lightingplus, established in 1982 in Ponsonby, Auckland, has 30 stores.
- Smiths City has 23 stores. There are no stores in Auckland. Its first store opened in Christchurch CBD in 1918.
- JB Hi-Fi has 14 stores. It opened its first store in Auckland CBD in 2007.
- Bond & Bond had 24, including 18 in Auckland, until its closure in 2013. The first store opened in Silverdale, Auckland in 1875.
- Dick Smith Electronics closed in 2016. It had 62 stores at the time. It went through several changes of ownership. Dick Smith Holdings (2013-2016)
- Hill and Stewart operated between 1951 and 2010. It had six stores around Auckland as of 2009.
- Jaycar has 20 stores.

=== Telecommunications ===
The three major companies in the New Zealand telecommunications industry operate retail stores. Spark New Zealand has 63 stores. One NZ also has 63 retail stores. 2degrees has 59 stores.

== Clothing, footwear and personal accessory retailing ==
Sales values in the sector increased from $1,811.1 million in 2000 to $3,942 million in 2021. The number of businesses increased from 2,442 to 2,865. The number of employees increased from 15,000 to 21,000.

=== Clothing ===
- Just Group has 167 stores: 45 Just Jeans stores, 28 Jay Jays stores, 19 Jacqui E stores, 19 Dotti stores, and 11 Portmans stores.
- Cotton On Group has 91 stores: 28 Cotton On stores, 23 Cotton Body stores, 25 Cotton On Kids stores, and 15 Peter Alexander stores. Its Supré chain had 19 stores until its closure in 2020.
- Hallensteins Glassons has 75 stores: 41 Hallenstein Brothers stores, and 34 Glassons stores.
- Barkers has 63 stores: 31 Barkers Mens Clothing stores and 32 Max Fashion stores.
- Bendon Lingerie has 36 lingerie stores.
- Retail Apparel Group has 33 stores: 11 Tarocash stores, nine Johnny Bigg stores, eight yd. stores, and five Connor stores,
- Country Road Group has 19 stores: 11 Country Road stores, and eight Witchery stores.
- Pepkor has 60 Postie stores.
- Rodd & Gunn has 28 stores
- Huffer has 13 stores.
- Icebreaker has 13 stores.
- H&M has nine stores.
- Nike has eight stores.
- Under Armour has four stores.
- R. M. Williams has four stores.
- Zara has one store.
- Pumpkin Patch had 48 stores in 2010, but all physical stores had closed by 2017.

=== Shoes ===
- Hannahs, established in 1868, has 70 sites branded as Hannahs and Number One Shoes.
- Overland Footwear Group, established in 1948, has 63 stores branded as Merchant 1948 and Mi Piaci.
- Accent Group, established in 1988, has 60 stores branded as Platypus, Hype DC, The Athlete's Foot, Timberland , Dr. Martens, and SUBTYPE.
- Shoe Clinic is a franchise of 19 sports shoes stores.
- Smith's Sports Shoes is a franchise of 14 sports shoes stores, established on Dominion Road, Auckland in 1949.
- Foot Locker has 13 outlets.
- NOVO Shoes have 13 outlets.
- Maher Shoes has six stores.

=== Jewellery ===
- Michael Hill Jeweller is a chain of 55 stores, founded in Whangārei in 1979.
- Pascoes the Jewellers is a chain of 41 stores, established in 1906 in Auckland CBD.
- Goldmark Jeweller is a chain of 12 stores established in 2007.
- Walker & Hall is a chain of 11 stores. It was established in 1899.
- Partridge Jewellers is a chain of seven stores, established in Wellington CBD in 1877.

== Motor vehicle and parts retailing ==
Quarterly sales revenue in motor vehicle and parts retailing sector increased from $1.5565 billion in the first quarter of 2000 to $3.8335 in the first quarter of 2021. The number of businesses increased from 468 to 834. The number of employees increased from 16,100 to 19,800, but continues to fluctuate each year.

=== Motor vehicle parts ===
New Zealand has two main chains of automotive part retailers sell a range of automotive parts, automotive accessories, power tools and engine oils.

Repco has been operating in New Zealand since 1981 and has 81 stores.

Supercheap Auto opened its first stores in New Zealand in 2003 and now has 46 stores in the country.

== Recreational goods retailing ==
Sales values in the sector increased from $1,531.8 million in 2000 to $2,858.8 million in 2021. The number of businesses increased from 2,034 to 1,821. The number of employees increased from 9,600 to 10,400.

=== Sporting goods ===
- Rebel Sport is a chain of 41 stores, established in Panmure, Auckland in 1996.
- Stirling Sports is a franchise of 60 stores, established on Dominion Road, Auckland in 1964.
- JD Sports has a store at Sylvia Park, Auckland; it opened in 2021.

=== Books and toys ===
- Paper Plus Group owns two bookstore franchises. Paper Plus began as National Stationers in 1983 before rebranding as Paper Plus in 1990; it has 91 stores. Take Note was established in 2001 through the rebranding of Top Line and Paper World stores; it has seven stores.
- Whitcoulls, established in 1888, has 53 stores.
- Toyworld is a franchise of 26 toy stores, founded in 1976.
- Unity Books, established in Wellington Central in 1967, has stores on Wellington's Willis Street and Auckland's High Street.
- Borders had five stores, before in closed in 2011. Its first store opened in Auckland CBD in 2000

=== Stationery ===
- Warehouse Stationery is a chain of 67 stationary stores. The first store opened in 1995.
- Smiggle is chain of 22 novelty stationary stores. It was established by Just Group in 2008
- Typo is a chain of 16 novelty stationary stores. It is owned by the Cotton On Group.
- Office Spot is a brand of stationery stores. Its original store, opened in Ashburton in 2007, is the only one still operating.

== Non-store and commission based retailing ==
Non-store retailers are businesses that have no permanent physical bricks and mortar retail stores, and exclusively sell their products exclusively through online stores, market stores, telemarketing, door-to-door sales and vehicles.

The number of businesses in the sector dropped to 1,299 businesses in 2003. The number of employees dropped to 1,450 in 2004. Since then, with the rise of e-commerce, the number of businesses has consistently increased. By 2021, the consisted of 2,937 businesses, with 3,350 employees and sales volumes of $2.3 billion.

In June 2024, RNZ reported that overseas-based online retailers such as Temu, Amazon and AliExpress were edging out New Zealand retailers. Infometrics chief forecaster Gareth Kiernan reported there was a 20 percent increase in 2024 in direct imports of low-value goods by households from overseas retailers. He attributed the growing popularity of online shopping to the COVID-19 lockdowns, the return of international freight and supply chains and the rising cost of living making people more price-sensitive and interested in bargains. According to NZ Post, 17% of New Zealanders ranked Temu as the online retailer they used the most.

== Furniture, floor coverings, houseware and textile retailing ==
Sales values in the sector increased from $1,318.8 million in 2000 to $2,767.5 million in 2021. The number of businesses increased from 1,485 to 1,734. The number of employees has increased from 7,000 to 9,100, except for a decline following the 2008 financial crisis.

=== Furniture and floor coverings ===
Some retailer specialise in furniture, such as Nood Furniture (15 stores), Freedom Furniture (14 stores), and Nick Scali Furniture (five stores). Harvey Norman and Smiths City sell a combination of household appliances. Department store chains like The Warehouse, Farmers and Kmart also sell furniture.

=== Houseware and textiles ===
- Briscoes is chain of 47 homeware stores. It opened its first New Zealand store in Dunedin Central in 1862.
- Stevens is a chain of 28 homeware stores. It opened its first store on Karangahape Road, Auckland in 1924.
- Spotlight is a chain of 20 homeware stores. The first New Zealand store opened in Wairau Valley, Auckland in 1996.
- Living & Giving is a chain of 15 homeware stores. It opened its first store in Mount Eden in 1987.
- Lincraft is a chain of six homeware stores. The first New Zealand store opened in 2005.

== Liquor retailing ==
Liquor retailers can sell beer, wine and cider like supermarkets and grocery stores, as well as spirits and RTDs. Sales values in the sector increased from $820 million in 2000 to $1.9375 billion in 2021. The number of businesses increased from 468 to 975. The number of employees increased from 2,800 to 3,650.

=== Major buying networks ===
- Metcash's Australian Liquor Marketers franchise network, based in Wiri, Auckland, includes 240 Liquor Centre and Liquor Spot franchisees and affiliates, and 114 The Bottle-O and Merchants Liquor franchisees.
- Foodstuffs' franchise network includes 147 LiquorLand franchisees around the country, and 16 Henry's franchisees in the central and lower South Island. Former franchise brands include Birds Liquorsave (1991-2005), The Mill (1993-2015), and Duffy & Finn's (2006-2011).
- Thirsty Liquor's franchise network includes 106 Thirty Liquor stores and 59 Black Bull liquor stores.

=== Other franchises ===
- Big Barrel is a network of 43 stores. It is based in Tamatea, Napier, which opened its first store in Marewa, Napier in 2003.
- Super Liquor is a franchise of 40 stores based in Newmarket, Auckland, founded in the late 1970s in Ilam, Christchurch.
- The Trusts / West Liquor is a non-profit chain of 22 stores in West Auckland established in 1971.

== Specialised food retailing ==
Sales values in the sector increased from $572.6 million in 2000 to $1.7483 billion in 2021. The number of businesses increased from 2,310 to 2,982. The number of employees increased from 8,000 to 11,100.

=== Bakeries ===
- Bakers Delight has 20 bakeries in New Zealand. The first New Zealand store opened in Pakuranga, Auckland in 1995.

=== Specialist food retailers ===
- Vetro is a franchise of six Mediterranean food stores, which has been run out of Ahuriri, Napier since it was founded in 1999.

== See also ==
- List of retailers in New Zealand
- List of shopping centres in New Zealand
- Hospitality industry in New Zealand
