= Hallensteins Building =

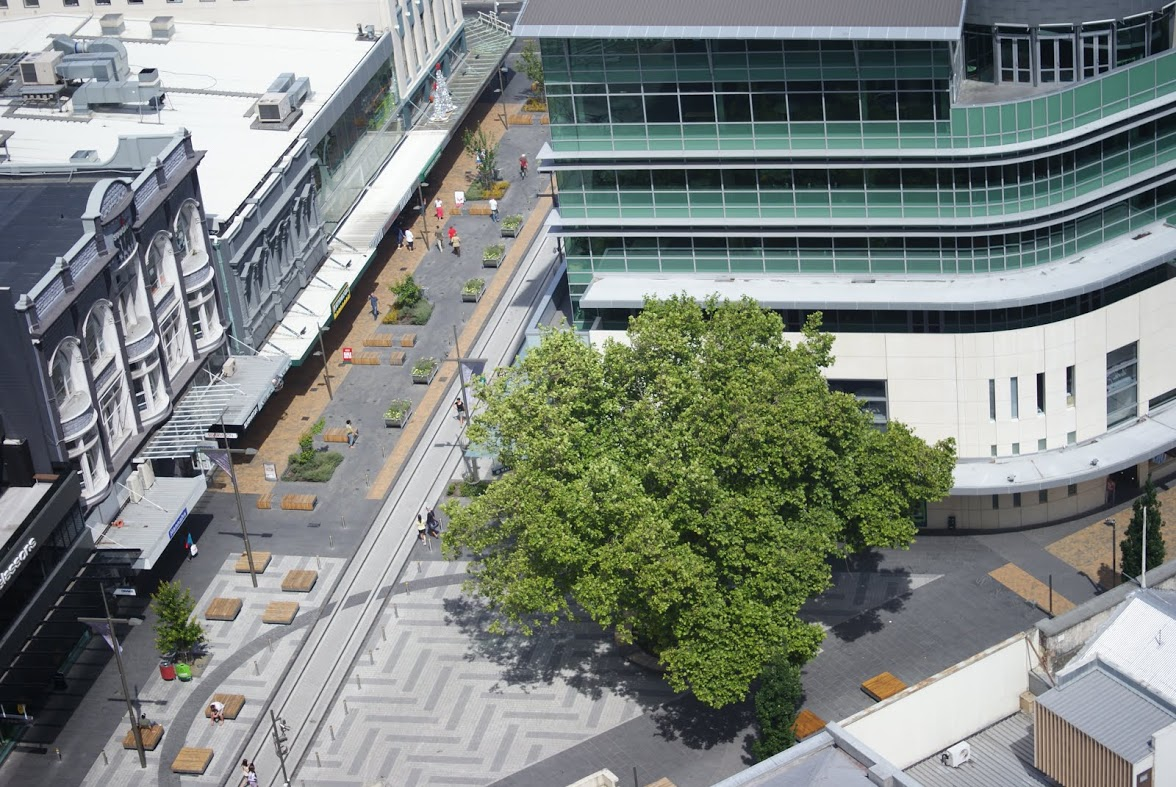
- The tower (right) and surrounding mall area in 2010
- Interactive map of the Hallensteins Building area
- Alternative names: Hallensteins Brothers Building, Unlimited Northern Tower

General information
- Architectural style: Contemporary
- Location: Christchurch Central City, New Zealand, 263 High Street
- Coordinates: 43°31′59″S 172°38′15″E
- Year built: 2004–2005
- Closed: 22 February 2011
- Demolished: June 2012
- Owner: Hallensteins Glassons

Technical details
- Floor count: 5

Design and construction
- Main contractor: Leighs Construction

The Hallensteins Building was a contemporary tower in central Christchurch, located on the High Street end of City Mall. It was sometimes referred to as the Unlimited Northern Tower due to its use as the main Unlimited Paenga Tawhiti campus building. The tower had five floors with a modern exterior, large glass windows, balconies, and a mezzanine floor on the top floor.

The tower was built in 2004 for Hallensteins Glassons to replace their former 1920s premises. Construction was completed in 2005 by Leighs Construction. The bottom two floors were used as retail space for a Hallensteins Brothers store, accessible from Cashel Street. The upper portion of the tower was used by Unlimited Paenga Tawhiti exclusively.

The Hallensteins Building was demolished in June 2012 after being cordoned off in the central city red zone. Details about the condition of the building are not known; in the 2010 Canterbury earthquake, the building had suffered minor damage but promptly reopened.

Hallensteins Brothers had operated from the site for over 100 years before the building was closed in 2011. A new Hallensteins Brothers store was rebuilt on the site in 2016, linked to the ANZ Center.

== History ==
=== Construction ===
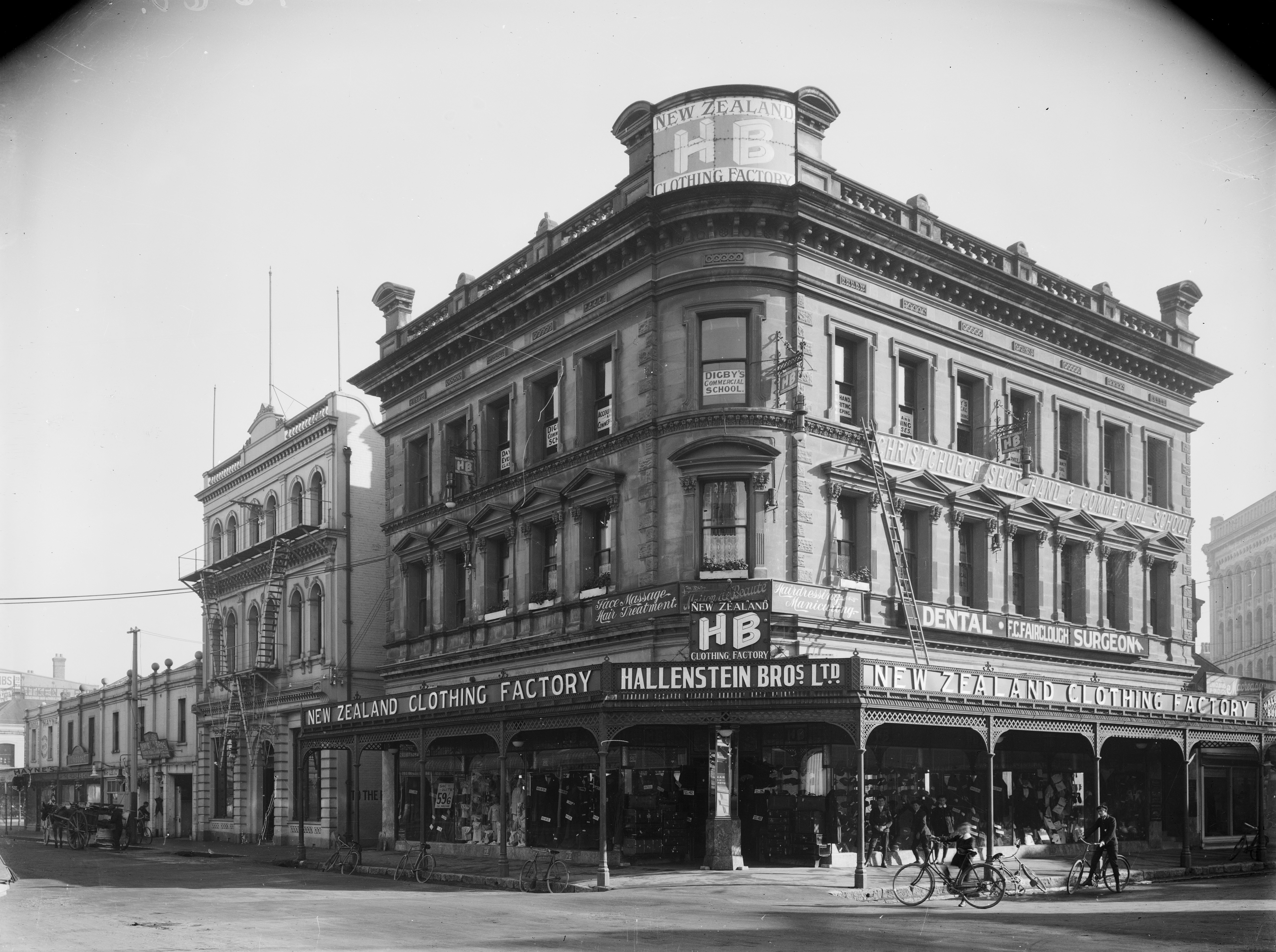
A former building on the same site in the 1910s, owned by Hallensteins.

The Hallensteins Building was constructed for Hallensteins Glassons to replace the former building which had been built in 1920. Hallensteins had operated from the site for over 100 years in various configurations.

The design had a large retail space on Cashel Street for a Hallensteins Brothers store. The building had a total of five floors. The fifth floor was double height, split with a large mezzanine space with stairwell access, functioning as an open sixth floor.

The project was undertaken by Leighs Construction in 2004 and completed in 2005. The company received the 2005 Canterbury Registered Master Builder of the Year award for the project.

=== Tenants ===
Hallenstein Brothers occupied the retail store which spanned over the ground floor and the first floor. The rest of the tower (floors two to five) were exclusively occupied by Unlimited Paenga Tawhiti secondary school, with each floor specially fitted to meet the needs of the school. It could be accessed from an entrance on High Street.

The top floor was sometimes used as a venue, dubbed "Level 5", to host local DJ gigs and raves organised by the Unlimited community.

=== Earthquake damage and demolition ===
The building survived the 2010 Canterbury earthquake with minor damage and was reopened after inspection. In late September, the store opened to the public to give away free clothes to support the community. An estimated 1000 people gathered from midnight to claim the free goods, worth an estimated NZ$125,000.

On the day of the 2011 Christchurch earthquake, some staff and students were present in and around the city campus. The Hallensteins Building was in the middle of the red zone area and blocked from public access. Its location was considered particularly dangerous as it was surrounded by volatile structures including the adjacent Westpac Canterbury Centre, the Fisher's Building, and in close proximity to the Hotel Grand Chancellor, as well as other badly damaged structures along the city mall.

The owners of the building chose to demolish it with no further details made public about its condition. At just six years old, it was one of the newer buildings to be demolished as a result of the earthquake. Demolition took place in June 2012.

In 2016, Hallensteins Brothers returned to the site in a new premises, which was built as part of the ANZ Centre complex.

== Design ==
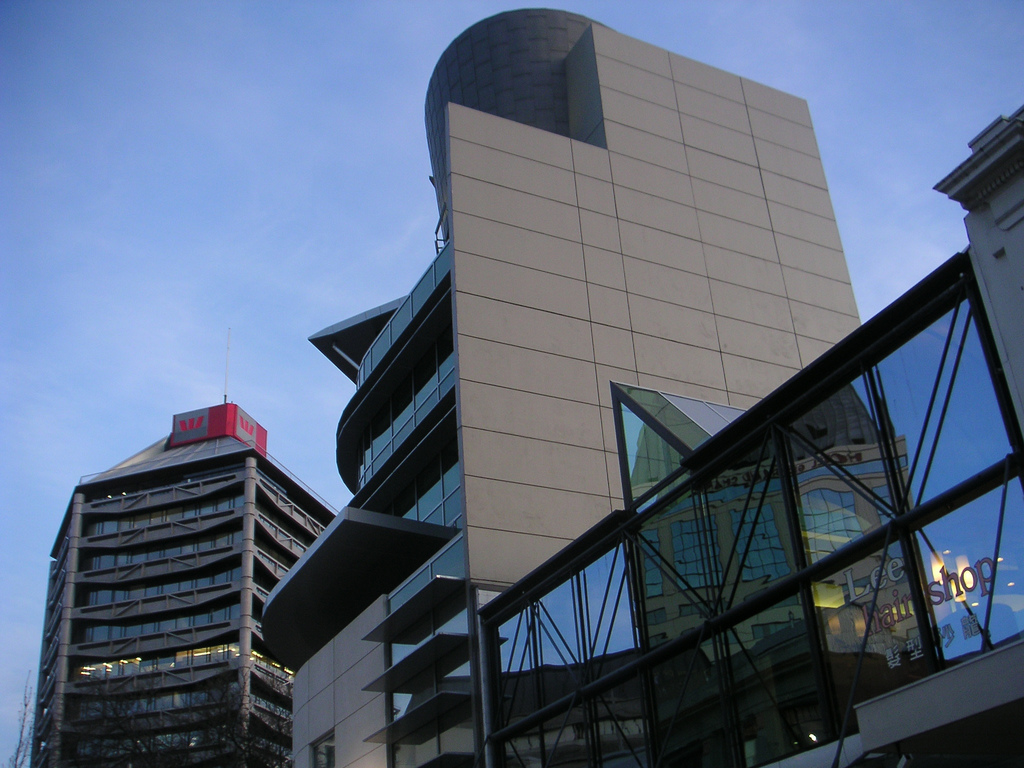
The circular roof structure and gray panels visible on the side of the tower.

The Hallensteins Building is an example of contemporary architecture. Built on a pointed site at the intersection of High Street and Cashel Street, the structure had a curve on the northern side, and a squarer shape on the southern side. The top of the building had a circular structure which reflected the curve, and two angled roofs over the rest of the building, which jutted out over the side, providing the upper floor and mezzanine space with shade.

The front sides of upper tower floors were largely covered in glass panels and metal joinery, with an opaque, greenish glass used to cover the structural parts of the frame. On the back of the building facing west, the tower was covered in grayish panels with no windows visible.

The interior of the upper floors, occupied by Unlimited Paenga Tawhiti, were designed for the requirements of the school. The main levels were open plan with folding partition walls, a kitchenette, side rooms, and desk space along the front windows. Three of the floors had a circular "nucleus" room in the middle of the space providing additional space for meeting rooms and lab work.
