= Discovery 1 =

Discovery 1 may refer to:

- Discovery 1, a school that merged with Unlimited Paenga Tawhiti to become the Ao Tawhiti state school, based in Christchurch, New Zealand.
- Land Rover Discovery 1, a first-generation Discovery SUV car model by Land Rover.
- NEAR Shoemaker, the first mission of the Discovery program.
- Discovery One, a fictional spacecraft
