= Lucy Gray (activist) =

New Zealand climate-crisis activist

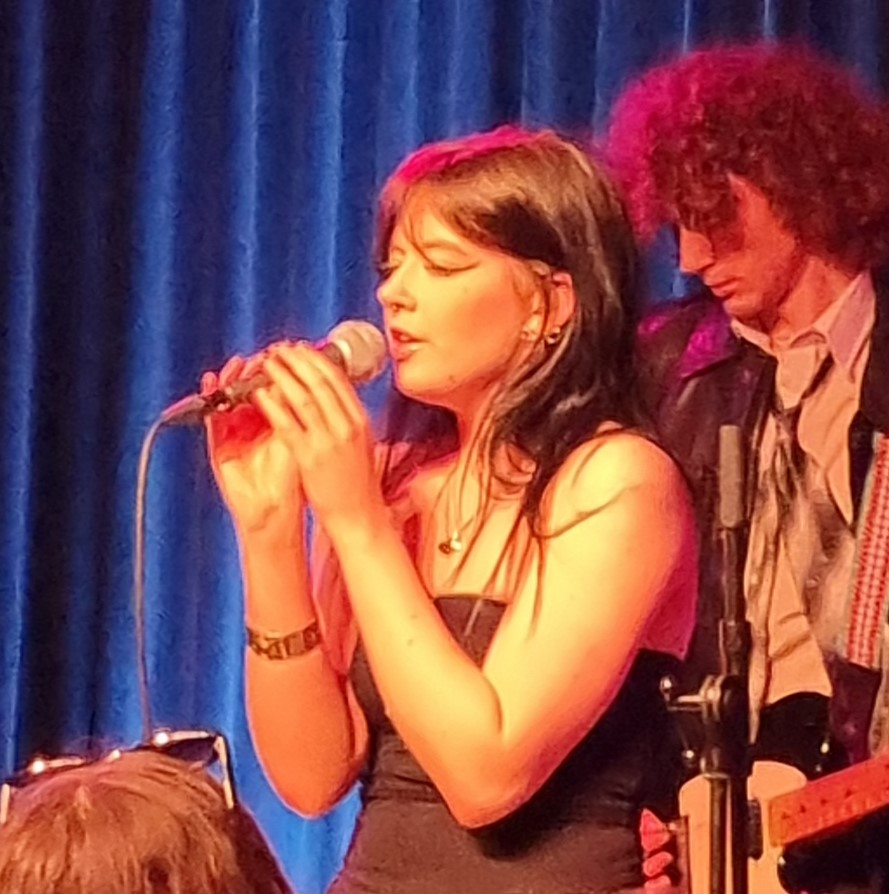
- Gray in July 2024
- Born: December 2006 (age 19)
- Occupations: School student Environmental activist Singer-songwriter
- Known for: School strike for climate

Lucy Alice Gray (born December 2006) is a New Zealand climate change activist and singer-songwriter. They are known professionally as Lucy Gray.

== Biography ==
Lucy Gray is a student at the Hagley School of Music in Christchurch, and was previously a student at Ao Tawhiti school, and Cashmere High School. They are a national chairperson of School Strike 4 Climate activities, including marches for school students to join. Gray is also a singer-songwriter who released their first single "Your Name" in 2022. Throughout 2023 and 2024 they released singles to build up to their debut EP 'whole life waiting', which was released in July 2024.

== Climate activism ==
As part of Gray's advocacy for the climate, three marches were scheduled to happen in 2019, on 15 March (which was abandoned for safety reasons due to the Christchurch mosque shootings), 24 May, and again on 27 September. A fourth, indoor protest took place in May 2020, while New Zealand was in lockdown due to the COVID-19 pandemic.

In May 2019, Gray met with Prime Minister Jacinda Ardern to discuss the government's plans to manage the climate change crisis. They have spoken at the 2019 National Young Leaders Day, 2019 Festival For the Future, and at TEDx Youth@Christchurch. In early 2020, they were a reader at the 1.5 Degrees Live! event. They were a keynote speaker at the online 2020–2021 Aotearoa New Zealand Sustainable Development Goals Summit.

Gray names Greta Thunberg, Swedish climate change activist, as one of their role models and inspirations. They are the author of "Rise Up", a climate change protest anthem.

== Music ==
Besides their song "Rise Up" (which was not released as a single), Gray has released multiple singles, including "Paranoia of the Mind", which released on 26 April 2024, and reached number 5 on the Hot NZ Singles Chart. "Paranoia of the Mind" was the last single before the release of their EP.

On 5 July 2024, Gray released their EP "Whole Life Waiting", with funding from the New Zealand on Air New Music Development grant. This EP consists of six songs, including their previously unreleased track "Running Through My Mind".

== Awards and honours ==
In 2022, Lucy Gray was awarded a Christchurch Civic Award, and was the youngest recipient ever.

== Discography ==
Title	Year	Album or EP
"Your Name"	2022	Non-album singles
"Pretty"	2023	Whole Life Waiting
"Coffee Breath"	2023	Whole Life Waiting
"Not Fair"	2023	Whole Life Waiting
"We Were the Scene"	2024	Whole Life Waiting
"Paranoia of the Mind"	2024	Whole Life Waiting
"Running Through My Mind"	2024	Whole Life Waiting
"Polar Orbit"	2024	Non-album singles
"Soft Spoken"	2025	Non-album singles
"Saviourism"	2025	Non-album singles
"Trying So Hard"	2025	Non-album singles
"Pull Out Mattress"	2025	Non-album singles
"Like a Star"	2026	Non-album singles
"G-r-o-u-p-i-e"	2026	Break it
"Phone Song"	2026	Break it
"The Bug"	2026	Break it
"Break"	2026	Break it
"I Get It From U"	2026	Break it
"U + I"	2026	Break it
"Do It Again"	2026	Break it
"Angel"	2026	Break it
"I Wish I Didn't"	2026	Break it
"Better Luck Next Time"	2026	Break it
