= Barkers =

New Zealand menswear fashion brand and retail chain

- Headquarters: Auckland, New Zealand
- Area served: New Zealand
- Key people: Jamie Whiting (chief executive officer and managing director)
- Products: Menswear
- Website: https://www.barkersonline.co.nz

Barkers, or Barkers Mens Clothing, is a New Zealand menswear fashion brand and retail chain. It has 34 stores around the country, including 13 in Auckland. It was established in Auckland CBD in 1972, and is headquartered in Grafton, Auckland. The chain sells a range of men's clothing, including shirts, knitwear, pants, jeans, sweatshirts, jackets and coats, blazers, t-shirts, shorts, polo shirts, socks, ties and belts.

Max Fashion, a New Zealand women's clothing retail chain, is a subsidiary of Barkers. It has 33 stores around the country, including 12 in Auckland. The chain sells dresses, tops, knitwear, jackets, coats, pants, skirts, singlets, sleepwear and swimwear.

== History ==
=== 1970s ===
Raymond Barker opened his first clothing store in 1972, on the corner of Victoria and High Streets of the Auckland CBD. The store faced stiff competition from 36 other specialist menswear retailers in the central city, with some threatening to cancel orders with suppliers and wholesalers that did business with Barker. The store sold original designs rather than those of major manufacturers.

Barker's charismatic 18-year-old salesman, Jeff Parsonson, went on to become his business partner.

A second store, named Collars and Cuffs, was opened five months later on nearby Queen Street, selling mostly body shirts. The store was moved to a larger site at 200 Queen Street, fitted out to theme of 1974 film The Great Gatsby, and renamed Barkers.

=== 1980s ===
Raymond Barker began opening illegally on Saturday mornings in 1980 with the nearby Record Warehouse, as a protest against the ban on Saturday trading. Despite campaigning by the Shop Employees Union to retain the ban, National Government legalised Saturday morning trading six months later.

Max Fashions was established separately in the 1980s by David Wright. It then came under the ownership of private equity companies, including Ezibuy and its parent company.

=== 1990s ===
Barker and his staff often travelled overseas to study international trends. By the 1990s, the Barkers brand had a baggy, over-sized style.

Store manager Lester Van Der Veer returned home in the early 1990s with the idea of a hooded sweatshirt and matching trackpants for both men and women. First XV rugby teams and rowing eight teams received trackpants and sweatshirts embroidered with their school and team to promote the products. More than 50,0000 pairs of the trackpants, manufactured in West Auckland, were sold in the next few years.

The arrival of Australian retailers in the 1990s, which sold cheaper Chinese-made clothing, forced Barkers to also move its manufacturing offshore.

=== 2000s ===
Barker sold the company in 2002 following a heart attack, and the company went through of ownership changes over the following decade. Retail and wholesale operator Ben Nathan owned the chain for a period; it had 18 stores during this time.

In 2006, Barkers had 19 stores.

==== 2010s ====
The company came under new ownership in the early 2010s. The brand was relaunched to focus on its heritage.

On its 40th anniversary in 2012, the company launched a Barkers branded magazine, beer, and a 7-inch single by Lawrence Arabia, and revived the 1990s trackpants. Barkers also began collaborating with other brands like Swanndri, Flying Nun Records, McKinlay's and Surfline, and it became the formalwear supplier to the All Blacks. The company's 25 stores were refitted with unique local themes, and the two flagship stores were opened on Auckland's High Street and Wellington's Lambton Quay.

In 2016, a transgender woman who had worked at the Barkers Groom Room attached to the Barkers High Street flagship store took a claim to the Employment Relations Authority that she had been unjustifiably dismissed after coming out.

In May 2018, First Union New Zealand accused Max Fashion (under its previous ownership) of requiring staff to work unpaid. Max Fashion said it had only received one complaint, from a staff member who worked 15 minutes over time under their contractual obligations.

In October 2018, Barkers announced it had acquired Max Fashion, giving it a combination of 40 Max stores, 30 Barkers stores, and a total of 600 stores. It also confirmed plans for an additional Barkers store at Commercial Bay Shopping Centre.

=== 2020s ===
In late 2019 and early 2020, the Max brand was relaunched with a new logo, campaign and sustainability policy. Its new product range included New Zealand merino wool knitwear, organic denim, recycled materials, and denim requiring reduced water usage.

Barkers and Max stores were required to close during the COVID-19 lockdown, like all clothing stores. Both chains applied for a government wage subsidy for more than 100 staff.

The restrictions caused a major loss of revenue for Max Fashion, increasing its debt to Barkers and creditors. It proposed closing 17 stores, bringing its store count to 23. By 2022, 32 Max Fashion stores were still operating.
