= Bendon Group =

New Zealand clothing company

- Founded: 1947 in New Zealand
- Area served: Australia, New Zealand
- Products: Clothing
- Revenue: NZ$71.4 million (2024)
- Parent: Foschini Group
- Website: bendongroup.com

Bendon Group is a New Zealand lingerie, underwear and sleepwear company. It includes the women's brands Bendon, Me by Bendon, Pleasure State, Lovable and Hickory, the fuller cup size brand Fayreform, and the men's brands Bendon Man and Davenport.

It has a chain of 36 dedicated lingerie retail stores in New Zealand, including 11 in Auckland.

Bendon products are also available through David Jones and Myer stores in Australia.

== History ==
=== New Zealand manufacturing (1947–2000) ===
Bendon was established in 1947 on Auckland's North Shore by Ray Hurley, a former naval officer and his brother Des Hurley, a pattern cutter. The company originally produced corsets but expanded into underwear after identifying a shortage following World War II. Their original brand name Hurley Bendon reflected their goal

In 1987, Bendon was bought by Ceramco Corporation.

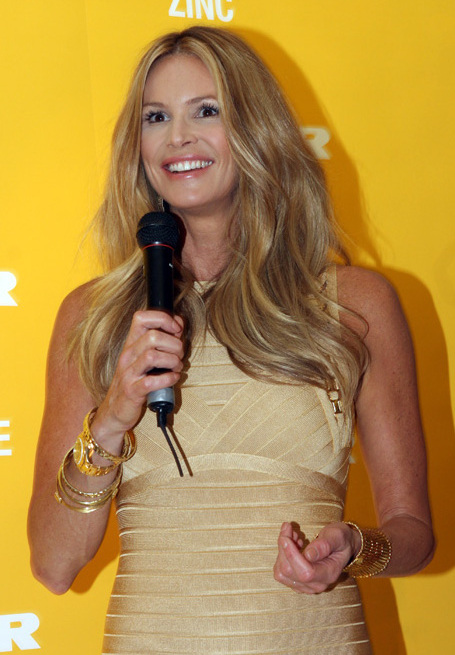
Elle Macpherson became the face of the brand in 1990.

Elle Macpherson was enlisted to the face of the brand in 1990. She continued her involvement with the brand until 2013. Macpherson partnered with Bendon to launch the Elle Macpherson Intimates brand.

During the 1990s, local manufacturers like Bendon faced increased competition from The Warehouse, DEKA and Farmers, which sold underwear imported from Asia at much cheaper prices.

Bendon turned around its declining profits in the late 1990s by expanding to Australia. Profits rose from $1.14 million in 1998 to $4.07 million in 1999.

=== Shift to offshore production (2000–2002) ===
In April 2000, Bendon planned to continue manufacturing and distribution in New Zealand. In June, it announced it would end all operations within six months, with the loss of 400 jobs at Te Rapa and East Tāmaki. All production was moved offshore to new or existing factories in Indonesia, Philippines, Thailand and China. The move ended mass production of underwear in New Zealand, "is seen as yet another nail in the coffin of apparel manufacturing" in New Zealand, and affected smaller supplies and businesses that relied on Bendon's business.

Bendon also moved its head office to Sydney in June 2000.

=== Eric Watson era (2002–2017) ===
Eric Watson's Pacific Retail Group brought the company for NZ$58.7 million in 2002. Watson continued to be involved in the company until late 2018.

Bendon opened the flagship retail store in Newmarket, Auckland in 2003.

Fashion designer Stella McCartney partnered with Bendon in 2007 to launch her own lingerie range in early 2008.

Watson merged Bendon with the Australian lingerie company Pleasure State in 2011.

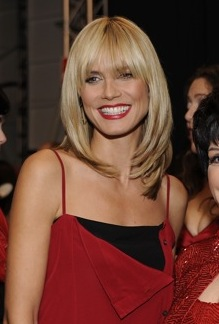
Heidi Klum established a partnership with the brand in 2014.

Heidi Klum was enlisted to a face of the brand from 2014. Bendon developed an underwear brand, Heidi Klum Intimates, with Klum. This brand replaced Elle Macpherson Intimates as the company's main brand.

In 2016, Stella McCartney announced plans to launch a swimwear range with Bendon the following year.

By 2017, the company was distributing its products through 4,000 shops in 34 countries and was operating 60 company-owned shops and outlet stores in New Zealand, Australia and Ireland. It had a head office in Auckland and international offices in Sydney, New York, London and Hong Kong.

=== Naked Brands era (2017–2021) ===
NASDAQ-listed lingerie company Naked Brands purchased Bendon in 2017, through a reverse takeover deal that gave Watson's company a majority share in the new company. Bendon had 700 staff and annual sales of $144 million at the time. The sale was investigated by liquidators when Cullen's company subsequently went into liquidation.

In September 2017, Bendon confirmed it was ending its relationship with Stella McCartney. Italian textile firm ISA Spa took over production of McCartney's lingerie and textile ranges from June 2018. Bendon sought other licenses to fill the gap.

At the time of the reserve takeover, Bendon was already breaching banking covenants for its 2016 loan with Bank of New Zealand. Bendon reported a loss of $37.4 million in the year to January 2018, and a $49.2 million loss in the year to January 2019. After being unable to obtain further finance from Watson, it looked to sell off brands instead. In January 2020, Bank of New Zealand considering not extending the company's loan.

=== Reorganization (2021–) ===
Naked Brands divested Bendon through a $1 peppercorn management buyout in April 2021. Naked Brands was attempting to free up capital and divest of unprofitable bricks and mortar businesses. Bendon had NZ$78.9 million in losses since the 2017 purchase and was on the brink of liquidation.

Under the deal, a $40 million loan was forgiven and Bendon had access to some cash and a $7 million loan facility at an annual interest rate below 5%. Co-owner and chief executive Anna Johnson said the company would refocus on comfortable underwear and professional in-store fittings. The company also abandoned its association with supermodels and focused on promoting its products with a broader range of body types.

The pandemic continued to affect revenue following the sale, with fixed costs remaining high. In February 2022, the new ownership had improved the company's balance sheets, but revenues were still being affected by the pandemic.

Retail operations became cashless enterprises and, in June 2023 and in June 2024, the company posted annual losses of $4.2 million and $4.1 million, respectively.

== Sponsorship ==
Bendon Lingerie has supported Thread Together, a network of mobile charity clothing vans in New South Wales, alongside Retail Apparel Group, Commonwealth Bank and the Goodman Foundation. The vans travel to Wagga Wagga, North Coast, South Coast and Sydney. In 2021, it sponsored an additional van for Brisbane and regional Queensland.
