= Ao Tawhiti =

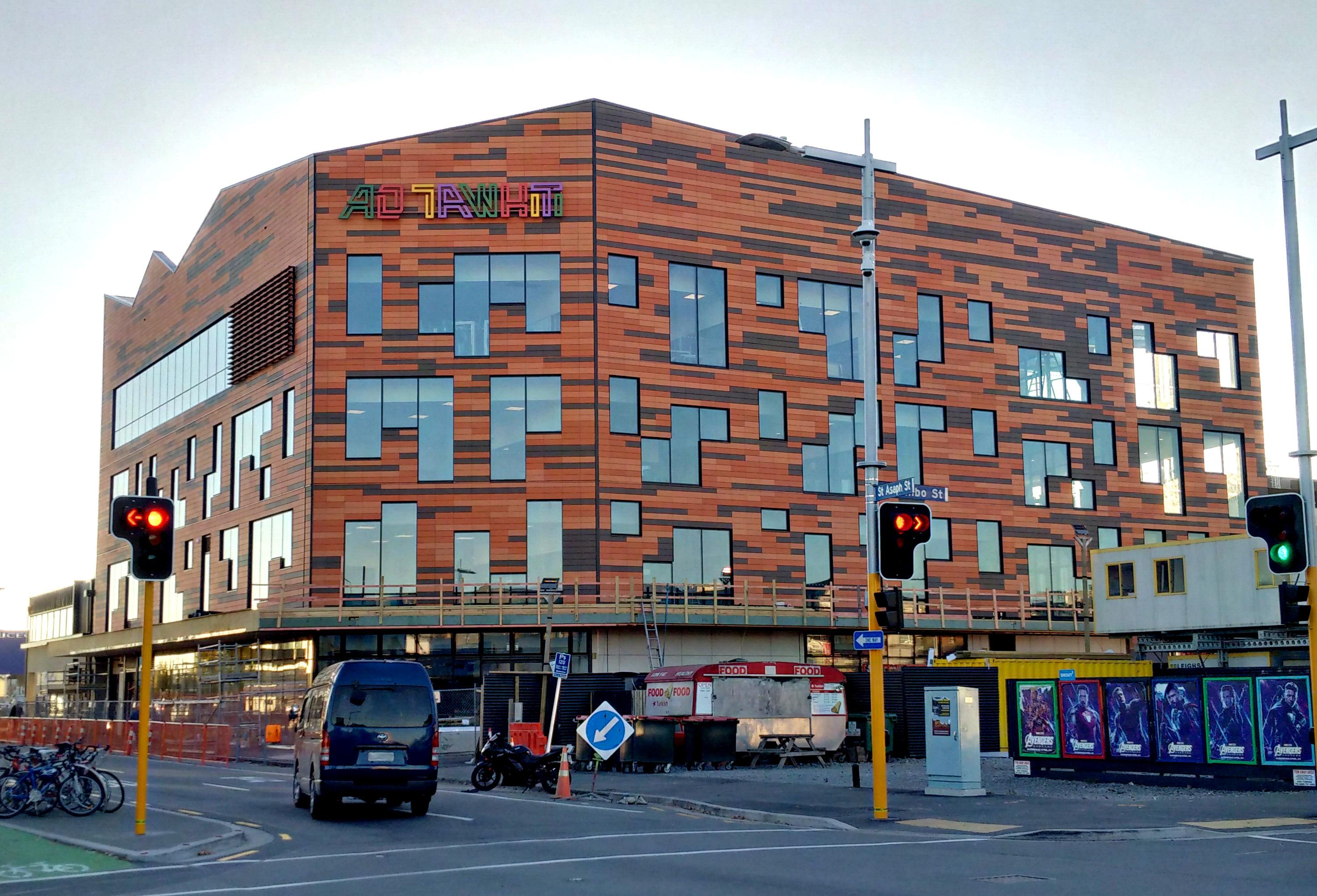
- Ao Tawhiti building, 3 May 2019

Location
- 5 Mollett Street, CHCH Central, Christchurch, New Zealand; 43°32′10.06″S 172°38′9.35″E

Information
- Type: State Co-educational Secondary, years 0–13, Designated Special Character school
- Established: 2014
- Ministry of Education Institution no.: 683
- Director: Anita Yarwood
- Enrolment: 649 (July 2026)
- Socio-economic decile: 7O
- Website: aotawhiti.school.nz

Ao Tawhiti or Ao Tawhiti Unlimited Discovery (ATUD) is a state area school in Christchurch, New Zealand. The school is one of eleven schools running under the "Designated Special Character" criteria of the Education Act 1989.

Students are given the flexibility to pick from a variety of interchangeable classes and subjects to design their own customised learning programme, including working on individual projects as an alternative to total classroom learning. They also have the option to learn subjects which are not traditionally taught in New Zealand secondary schools, such as philosophy, video game design, DJing and music production.

The original concept for the school was explored in 1993 by John Clough in the Alpha Learning Programme, based on a progressive learning theory. The concept was trialed in 1998 at Elmwood School. Following approval for the school under designated special character criteria, a primary school named Discovery 1 was launched in 2001 in central Christchurch. In 2003, a secondary school named Unlimited (later renamed to Unlimited Paenga Tawhiti) was established nearby in the city mall area.

In 2005, Unlimited expanded into the newly built Hallensteins Building, a tower block at the intersection of High Street and Cashel Street, and occupied the basement area below the bus exchange. Both Discovery and Unlimited became established as part of the central city community by the late 2000s, which became central to the culture and identity of the school.

In 2011, the campus buildings were damaged in the 2011 Christchurch earthquake, and were later demolished. The schools setup temporary premises in the Halswell Residential College campus in Aidanfield. In 2013, they relocated to the University of Canterbury Dovedale campus in Parkstone Avenue, Ilam. Later that year, it was announced that Discovery and Unlimited would be merged to form a new school, temporarily named Unlimited Discovery Merged School. The merger took place in 2014 with both schools operating independently from the Dovedale campus in the interim, with the future name of the school confirmed as Ao Tawhiti Unlimited Discovery.

Construction on a new, purpose-built inner-city building started in 2017 and was completed two years later. Since April 2019, the school has operated as Ao Tawhiti from the St Asaph location.

== History ==
Ao Tawhiti was formed in 2014, by the merger of two schools which were each established by the Learning Discovery Trust. Originally they existed as two separate entities, known as Discovery 1 (primary) and Unlimited Paenga Tawhiti (secondary).

=== Early history ===
Under the direction and leadership of John Clough, the Alpha Learning Programme explored innovative and progressive learning theory in education for two years from 1993. In late 1998, following the creation of the 'Learning Lab' trial at Elmwood School, an application was lodged to then Minister of Education Wyatt Creech, to construct a new school based on this education theory. The Ministry acknowledged the special character of the school concept and granted it a special character designation. Discovery 1 was established in 2001, followed by Unlimited in 2003. Both had been formed by Christchurch-based Learning Discovery Trust.

==== Unlimited 2003–2011 ====
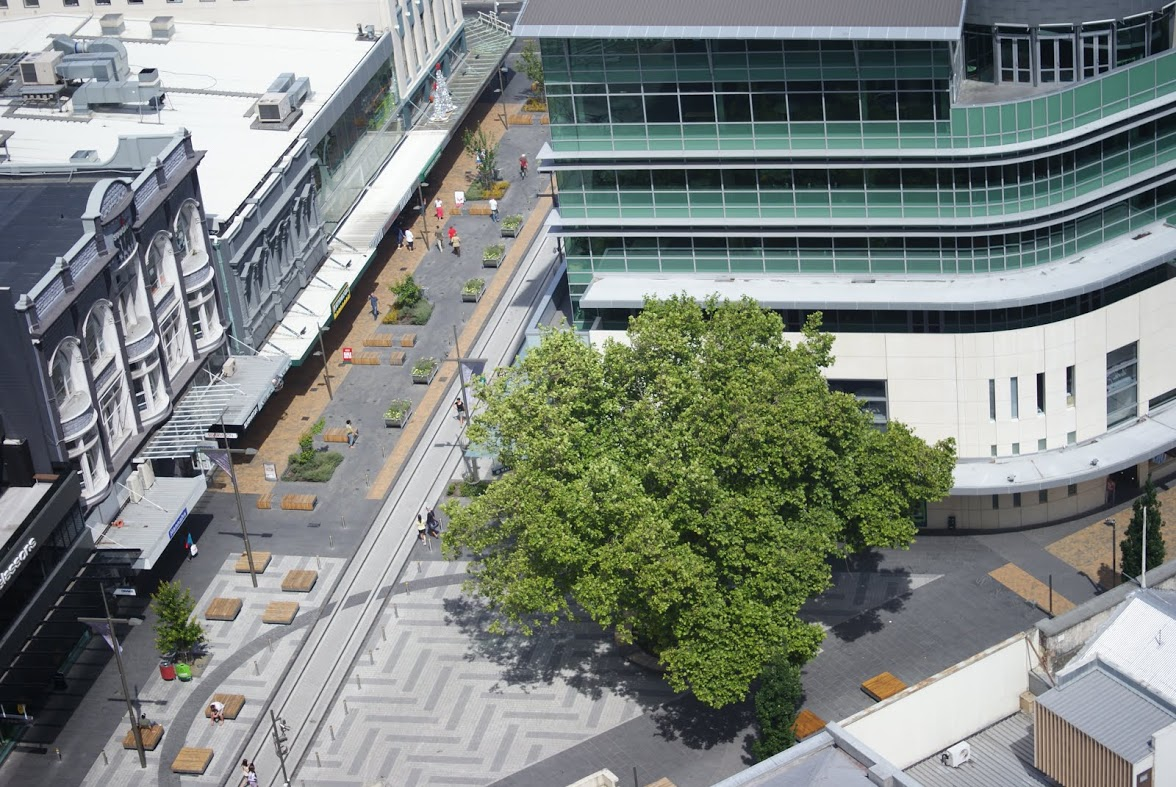
Unlimited 'Southern Star' building to the mid-left and Northern Tower to the right, a thoroughfare for students, intersecting on High Street and Cashel (2010)

Unlimited started with just 40 students (dubbed the "foundation forty") as well as 7 staff. It opened in January 2003 at its site on Cashel Street. Unlimited was originally based on the first floor of the Southern Star House building (which housed shops on the ground floor) and later occupied the second floor as well.

Ao Tawhiti claim that in 2003 a New Zealand business magazine named 'Unlimited' allegedly challenged the Unlimited school in relation to their name. The school claims it responded by renaming Unlimited to Unlimited Paenga Tawhiti, although few details about the case are given.

In 2004, the construction of the Hallensteins Building (known as "Northern Tower" by those at the school) was established across from Unlimited's original premises on the corner of Cashel Street and High Street. It was built to help facilitate the growing number of students, which was upwards of 200 at the time. Students and staff moved into the building in 2005. Unlimited also expanded into the basement of The Crossing building that year, next door to the Southern Star Building. Unlimited's presence in the city centre was a core aspect of the school's student culture and philosophy to learning, and the building was important in the development of this culture.

On 13 August 2007, students from Unlimited staged protests on Stewart Fountain, a public water feature dedicated to Sir Robertson Stewart situated near the school. The students criticised the council for moving in to demolish the fountain after Stewart had died earlier that day. As many as 30 students remained after school hours and attempted to stage a second protest throughout the night. Police reportedly decided to remove protesters, arresting thirteen people; nine were released for being under seventeen and were dealt with by Youth Aid.

By 2008, Unlimited reached a maximum MOE roll of 400 students.

==== Discovery 2001–2011 ====
Discovery was first based above a restaurant named 'The Loaded Hog' on Manchester Street. It began its first term with thirty students and eight staff. The following year the school increased by fifty new students.

During the later years of the schools operation, Discovery 1 was based on the upper levels of The Crossing on the corner of Colombo Street and Cashel Street. It was accessible through the bus exchange and an adjacent multi-level car park. Although located on the same streets, students had no academic contact and were largely separated from Unlimited students due to the location of Discovery within the building, and limited accessibility. Despite this, the schools were often seen as sister schools as it was common for Discovery 1 students to move on to Unlimited, or have older siblings attending Unlimited. They would also share space if buildings were under maintenance or development so many staff and students were familiar to one another.

=== February 2011 Christchurch earthquake ===
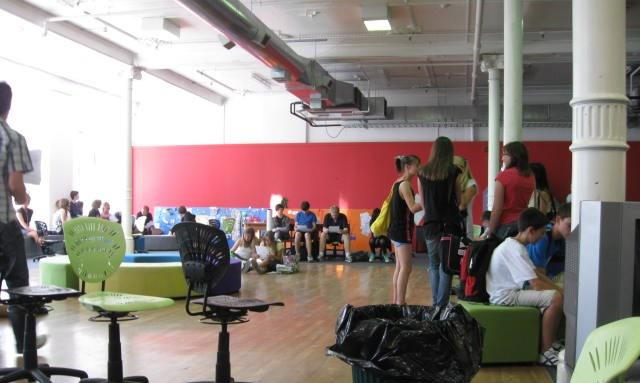
Students in the Southern Star building during orientation in 2011, a month before the earthquake

Some students, staff and visitors were present in the Unlimited buildings during the 6.3 magnitude earthquake on 22 February 2011. A number of people, particularly students, were not present that day or had left the school the hour before the quake, due to many staff attending a paid union meeting in the Christchurch Town Hall.

Discovery 1 was operating normally that day and had a regular attendance. At the time of the earthquake the school was on its lunch break and had a number of staff out, as well as a small group students on an unsupervised trust licence trip. The smaller number of staff in the building left the top floor absent of staff which lead to the students on that level waiting under tables for a number of minutes. The school grouped in the schools third floor assembly area. As they were there, a parent attempting to enter the school alerted several police officers on Colombo Street to the presence of the school and together entered the building to evacuate the school. The school then followed a predetermined plan to evacuate to Christchurch Botanic Gardens where parents would collect children. The small group of students on the unsupervised trust licence trip followed the same plan, eventually reuniting with the rest of the school.

The Hallensteins Building (dubbed the "Northern Tower") had already suffered minor damage in the 2010 Canterbury earthquake but was safe to use through to February 2011. After the 2011 Christchurch earthquake, the building was said to be structurally safe, but was demolished in 2012 allegedly at the will of the owners.

The Southern Star Building was severely damaged, losing some of its front facade, as well as having a partially collapsed ceiling on the second floor. The building was demolished by 2013.

Unlimited also occupied a basement area below The Crossing food court building which housed music rooms, a dance floor, and a woodwork area. In 2012 as part of the UC Quakebox project, an Unlimited staff member who was present on the day of the earthquake recounted entering the basement to check if any students were trapped after power had been lost, to find the area was flooding from burst pipes and the floor had become unstable. The basement area was closed following the events, and buildings which were connected to this section of The Crossing were de-constructed and rebuilt upon in the following years.

Before demolition work began on the Unlimited buildings, John Mather (then the school director) announced that the school Board of Trustees had decided the school would not return to the site. Mather announced the school would consider rebuilding in the city in the future. Mather would retire from the role before rebuild plans were established.

=== Post-earthquake era (2011–2019) ===
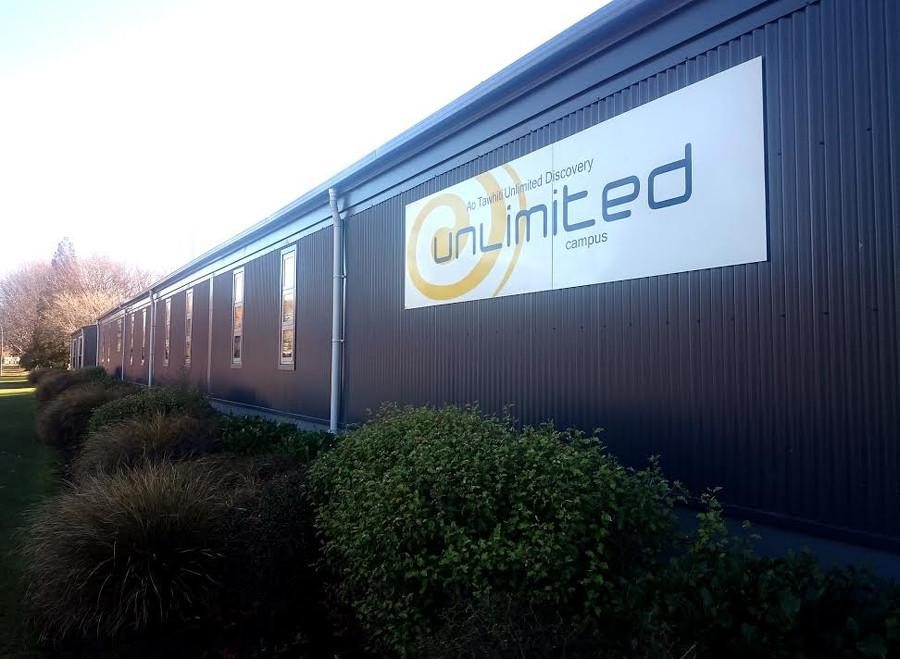
Temporary Unlimited campus at the University of Canterbury, June 2015

Staff at Unlimited were presented with a Christchurch Earthquake Award in 2012 (one of 140 awarded to individuals and organisations nominated by the public) for the evacuation of hundreds of students from the city location, which was surrounded by damaged buildings and rubble, including the damaged façade of the Southern Star building itself.

Because the schools were situated in the central business district (in what became the "red zone", an area made inaccessible to the public during demolition works) and due to the importance of the city environment to the style of learning and the student community, students at Unlimited and Discovery were significantly displaced. Unlimited and Discovery 1 were relocated to the Halswell Residential College campus in Aidanfield. Unlimited remained there throughout 2011 and 2012, while Discovery 1 continued to operate from the site.

In April 2011, singer-songwriter Imogen Heap visited Christchurch to play a benefit show for the school. It was her only performance in the country that year, and all proceeds went towards the future costs of rebuilding the school.

In January 2013, Unlimited relocated to the premises of the former Christchurch Teachers' College in Parkstone Avenue, Ilam, which later became part of the University of Canterbury. The school was located at the Wairarapa Block of the Dovedale Campus. The move was first announced in 2011 by John Mather (then director) who cited the lack of suitable spaces at the Halswell site. Mather retired from the role shortly after, where the school was then co-directed by Tanja Grzeta and Alastair Wells (formerly a senior lecturer at Auckland University). Grzeta left the role after a cancer diagnosis and died in 2015.

The Dovedale campus provided the school with on site facilities it didn't have prior. This saw a large rise in the participation of sports within the school. The school fielded teams in sports neither Unlimited or Discovery had prior. Lunchtime summer volleyball in the schools quad became a yearly regular, with students and staff participating. "Juniors vs Seniors" and "Students vs Staff" football games became annual events with much of the school participating or watching.

=== Merging of Discovery and Unlimited (2013–2014) ===
On 26 March 2013, Minister of Education Hekia Parata wrote to Unlimited and Discovery 1 with confirmation of a proposed merger between the schools. The decision was made as an outcome of the Ministry of Education's "Shaping Education" consultation. In November 2013, Steven Mustor was appointed the director of the merged school. He had previously worked as a learning advisor at Unlimited for seven years leading up to the 2011 earthquake.

By January 2014, both schools would be merged into a single school for years 1 to 13 students. The school was temporarily named Unlimited Discovery Merged School. An elected board governed the school within three months after the process was completed.

In early March 2014 it was announced that the Board of Trustees had settled on a new name for the school, Ao Tawhiti, with the motto "Unlimited discovery". On 15 April 2014, the Ministry of Education confirmed the name of the school as "Ao Tawhiti Unlimited Discovery". From 2015, the school was split into two campuses bearing the names of each former school respectively, and continued to operate from the Dovedale campus following the merger, until 12 April 2019.

=== Rebuild and return to city (2017–2019) ===
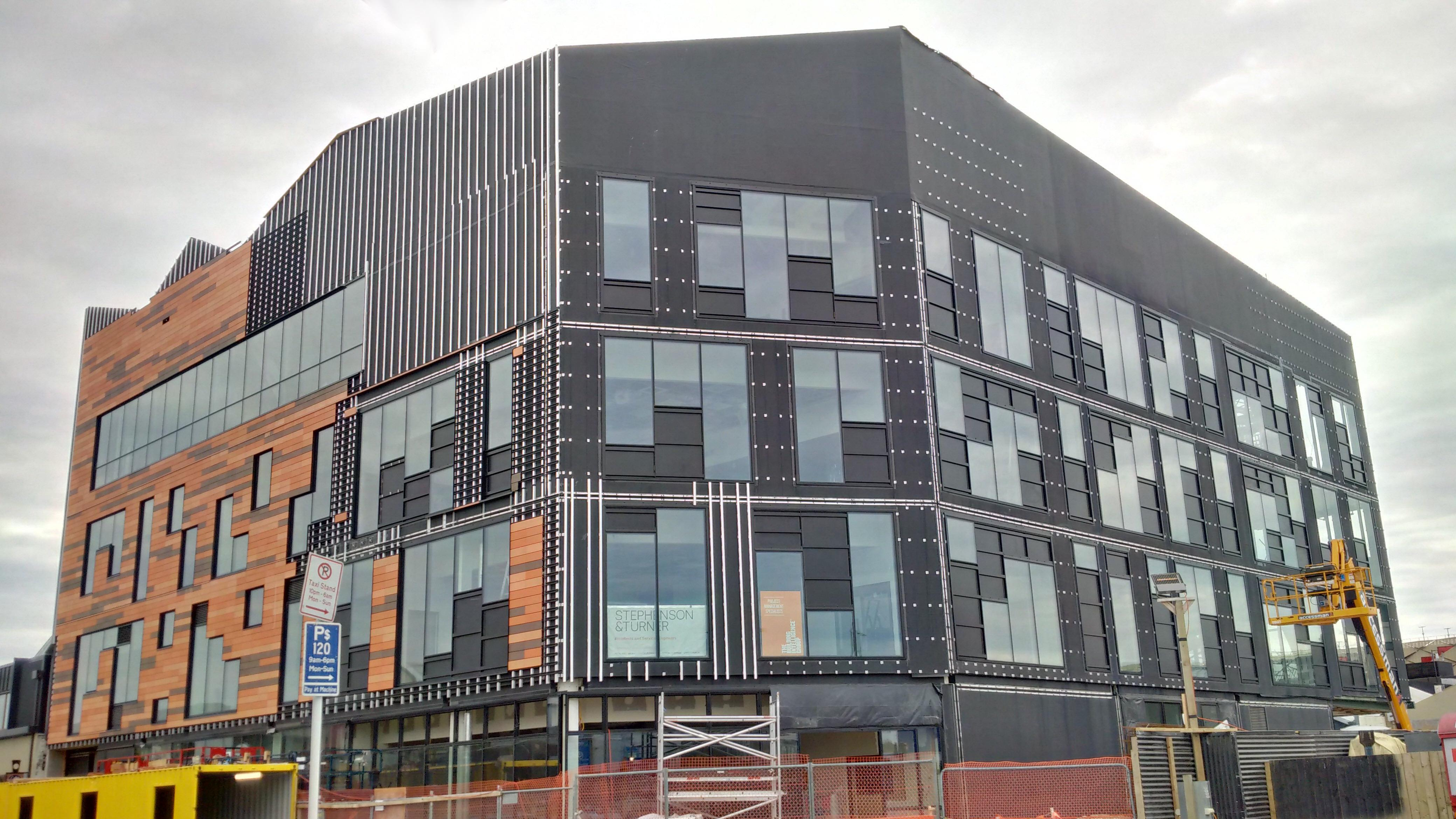
Ao Tawhiti building during construction, February 2019

Plans for the school to the return to the Christchurch CBD by 2017 were delayed, in part due to difficulties in securing land. The school had hoped to rebuild on High Street on the site of the former Centra Building, then owned by Carter Group, but negotiations fell through. A spokesperson for the school board described the setback as "devastating".

On 24 August 2016, Nikki Kaye, then Associate Minister of Education announced that the revised site for Ao Tawhiti Unlimited Discovery was to be 177 St Asaph Street. Building work began in late 2017, and cost approximately thirty-million New Zealand dollars. In early 2019, Ao Tawhiti had received strong interest as it neared the completion of its new building; applicants were placed in a ballot system due to high demand for places. The school planned to start with 570 students and increase to 670 by 2021.

Students and staff farewelled the Dovedale campus days before the first term of the year ended on 12 April 2019, marking the last day at the temporary site. Ao Tawhiti reopened at the St Asaph street address on 29 April 2019, following the public school holiday, although students did not return until several days after.

==== Building design ====
The Ao Tawhiti building was designed by Stephenson & Turner Architects, and developed with Lewis Bradford, Aurecon, Tonkin & Taylor, Beca and Aecom, Masterguard, and project managed by The Building Intelligence Group. It spans over 2200-square-metres and four-storeys with 5800-square-metres of space, designed to have a number of flexible spaces with interchangeable uses to serve up to 670 students. The ground floor is configured for technology and drama, with science and music facilities configurations on the first and second floors respectively. The technology and drama spaces are visible from street level, with the drama space doubling as a breakout space to the adjacent Mollett Street. The top floor houses a gymnasium and commercial-grade kitchen. Each floor above ground level has a large north facing balcony. The building features a central atrium that provides space for assembly and performances.

=== Ao Tawhiti (2019–present) ===
In 2020, Ao Tawhiti announced that Anita Yarwood would take over as director from 2021, replacing Mustor who had overseen the school during the post-quake period.

In 2022, around 60 students participated in a network test as part of a project to provide free Wi-Fi internet in the Christchurch city centre. The project was coordinated by Enable.

In 2023, Yarwood tendered her resignation, but retracted it five months later. In an interview, Yarwood cited burnout from being the first director of the merged school at its new premises, as well as challenges caused by the 2020 COVID-19 pandemic.

== Enrolment ==
As of July 2026, Ao Tawhiti has roll of 649 students, of which 97 (14.9%) identify as Māori.

As of 2026, the school has an Equity Index of 442, placing it amongst schools whose students have below average socioeconomic barriers to achievement (roughly equivalent to decile 7 under the former socio-economic decile system).

== Distinctive elements ==
- Students can follow their own pathways of learning. The school uses the term "self directed learning" to distinguish between learning taking place in a class and learning driven or directed by the student outside of a classroom setting. Often called inquiry learning, this means that students can opt to work outside of classes and courses on their own passions and interests, drawing on resources and experts as needed. In practice the amount of time given over to this individual, and often independent, style of learning varies according to the interests and maturity of each student.
- Teachers at the school are known as Learning Advisors. They are responsible for running classes as well as running individual homebases, where they support each student. Each year, students are allowed to select their preferred homebase, which is distinguished largely by the learning advisor who runs it.
- One of the school's guiding principles is "everyone's a teacher, everyone's a learner", which removes some arbitrary hierarchy and contributes to the model of mutual respect between staff and students.
- The school year at Ao Tawhiti is divided into four terms. Students take courses in subjects for the duration of a term, or can enroll for longer periods up to a full academic year.
- Students are vertically grouped in homebases (similar to form classes). Years 7–13 homebases have up to 16 students in them and Years 1–6 homebases have up to 21 students.
- Teacher facilitated courses are offered for Year 1 – 6 children in all of the main subject domains. In addition, children are encouraged to carry out their own inquiries and to lead or opt into workshops or projects that are either initiated by themselves, other children, parents or teachers. From year 7 to year 13 a number of structured courses are offered and facilitated by teachers, and many of the courses contribute to achievement on the New Zealand Qualifications Framework such as NCEA. Classes are open to students of any age and students can work at whichever level of the curriculum that best serves their needs. Each student has an allocated weekly one-to-one time with their Learning Advisor. Mentoring is offered on some days in the morning and again in the afternoon. This time allows students to meet with subject teachers to get support on course based learning, independent based learning, and other curriculum opportunities not currently available in classes.
- The school is resourced with high-end information and communications technology (ICT), all students have the opportunity to gain qualifications in the New Zealand National Certificate of Educational Achievement (NCEA). There are a range of secondary school subjects on offer including English, Mathematics, Science, Social Sciences, Computing, Drama, Dance, and Physical and Outdoor education. In addition to these subjects, Ao Tawhiti offers a range of courses that are not normally provided at secondary schools. These include DJ performance and music production, Holistic programmes, Philosophy, Psychology and Game design.

Courses provided by outside providers are also offered, for example Ao Tawhiti offers students the ability to participate in courses taught by Yoobee School of Design, ARA and The University of Canterbury. The school also runs a programme in cooperation with the Canterbury Ballet School.

== Notable students ==
- Corey Baker – classical and contemporary choreographer and named 2022 UK New Zealander of the Year
- Joris De Vocht – New Zealand Trade Commissioner in Beijing
- Lucy Gray – climate change activist and singer-songwriter
- Rangimarie Te'evale-Hunt – Te Reo Māori in elevators
- Phoenix Tumataroa – fashion designer
