= Retail Apparel Group =

Clothing retail company

- Industry: Retail
- Founded: 2007
- Headquarters: Waterloo
- Area served: Australia; New Zealand; Singapore
- Products: Clothing
- Parent: Foschini Group
- Website: rag.net.au

Retail Apparel Group is a clothing retail company, wholly owned by the Foschini Group. The company operates stores under the Tarocash, Connor, yd., Johnny Bigg, Rockwear and AXL+Co brands in Australia, New Zealand and Singapore.

== Brands ==
=== Tarocash ===
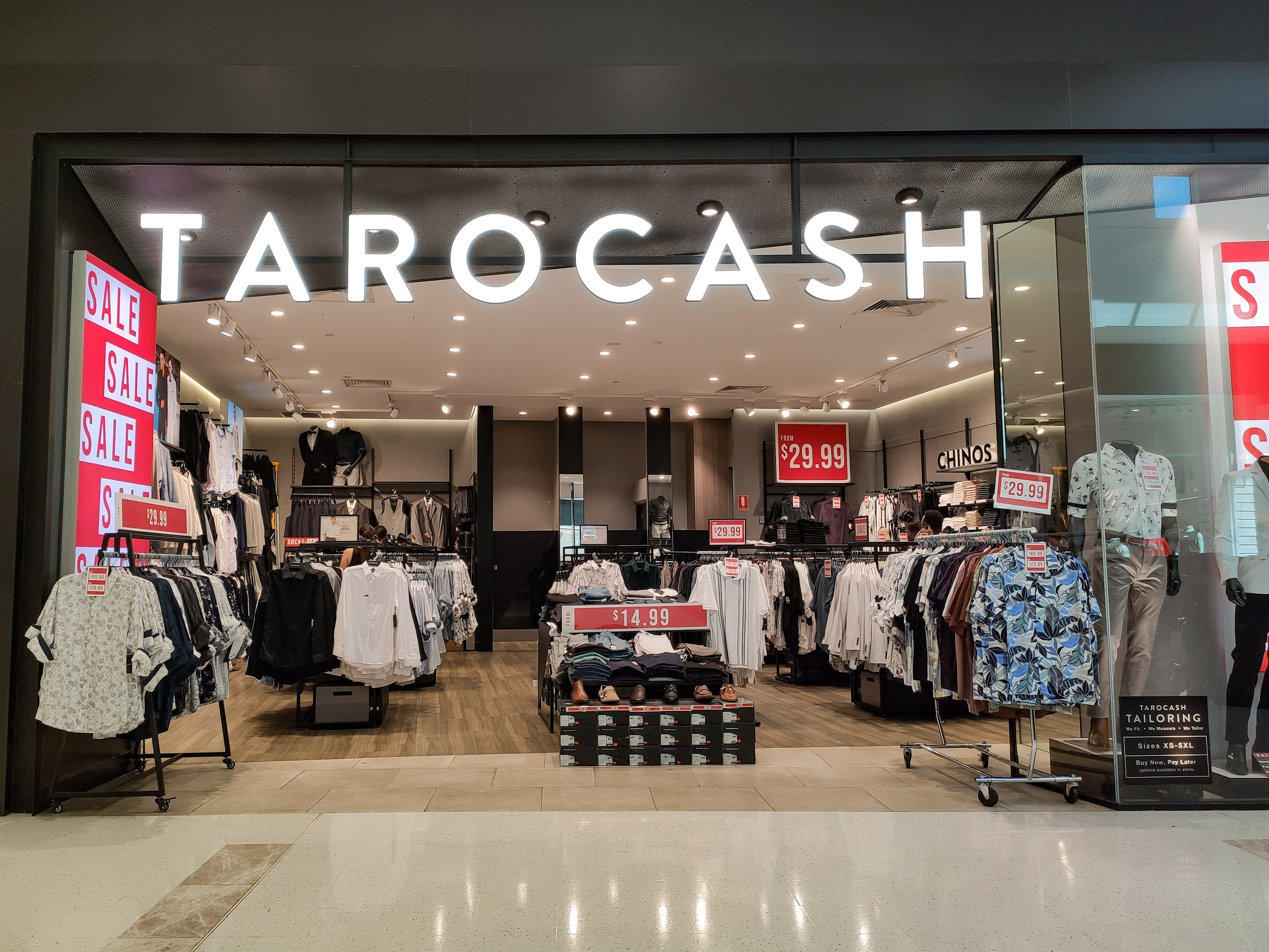
Tarocash store in Westfield Carousel

Tarocash is a men's formal wear brand established in 1987.

There are 103 Tarocash stores in Australia. There are 12 stores in New Zealand, including eight in Auckland.

Tarocash is the main retailer of affordable suits for millennial and Generation Z consumers in Australia, but is often ridiculed for its cheap polyester clothing.

=== Connor ===
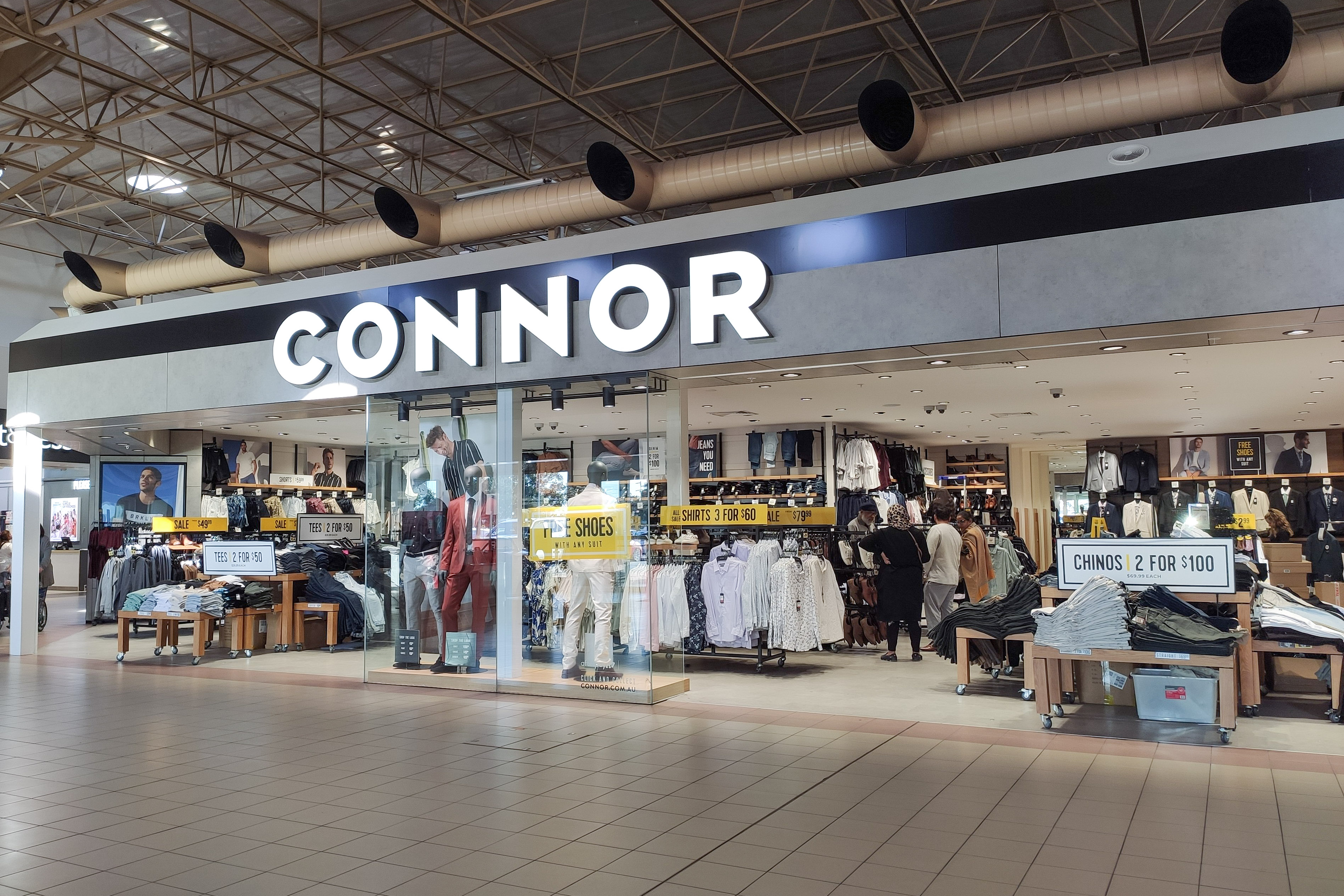
Connor store in Maddington, Western Australia

Connor is a menswear chain selling formal, smart and casual clothing at affordable prices established in 2006.

There are 189 Connor stores in Australia, 16 in New Zealand and 1 in Singapore.

=== yd. ===
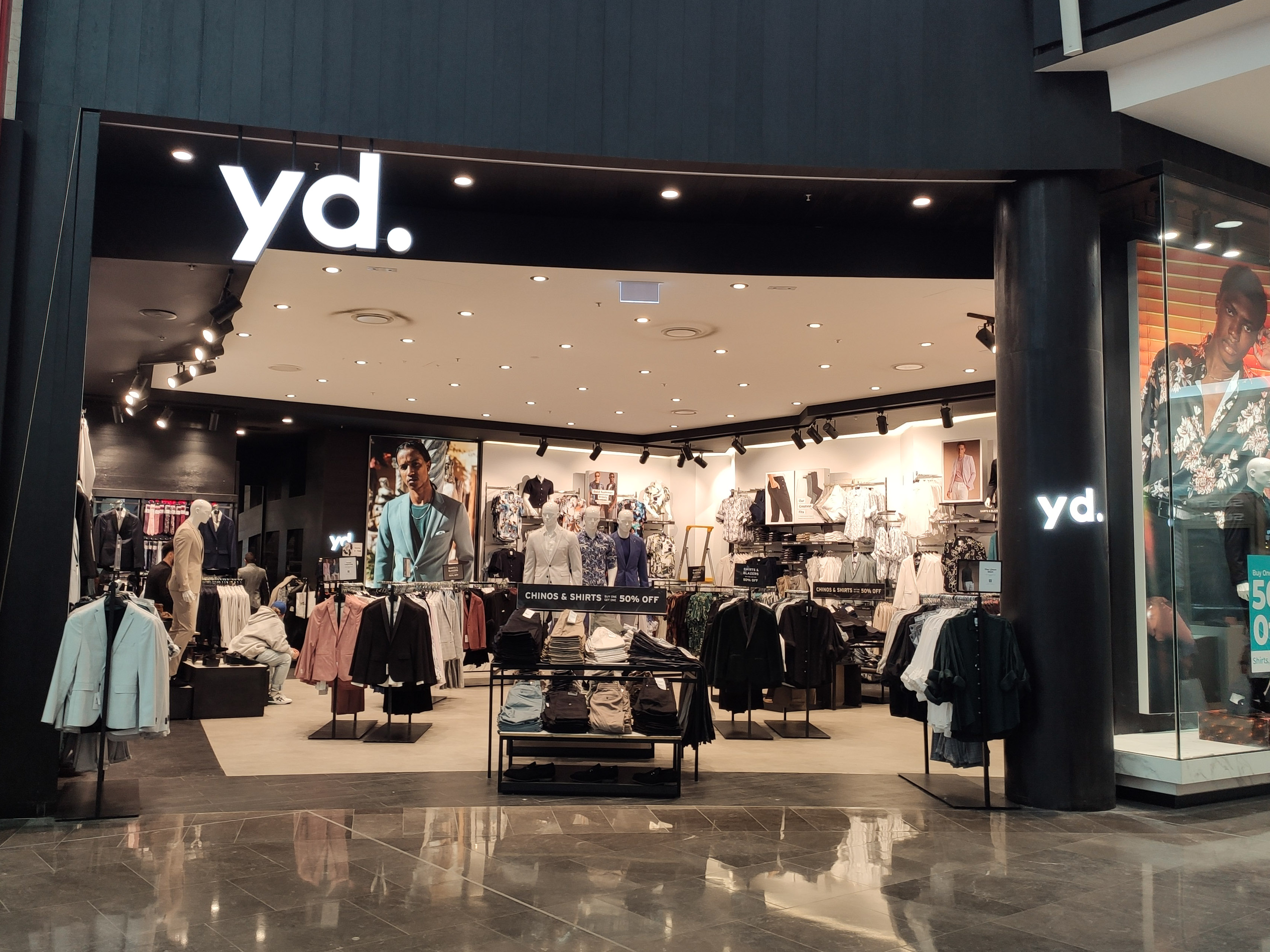
yd. store in Westfield Carousel

yd. is a menswear store specialising in the latest fashion trends. It was acquired by Retail Apparel Group in 2007.

There are 120 yd. stores in Australia. There are eight stores in New Zealand, including four in Auckland.

=== Johnny Bigg ===
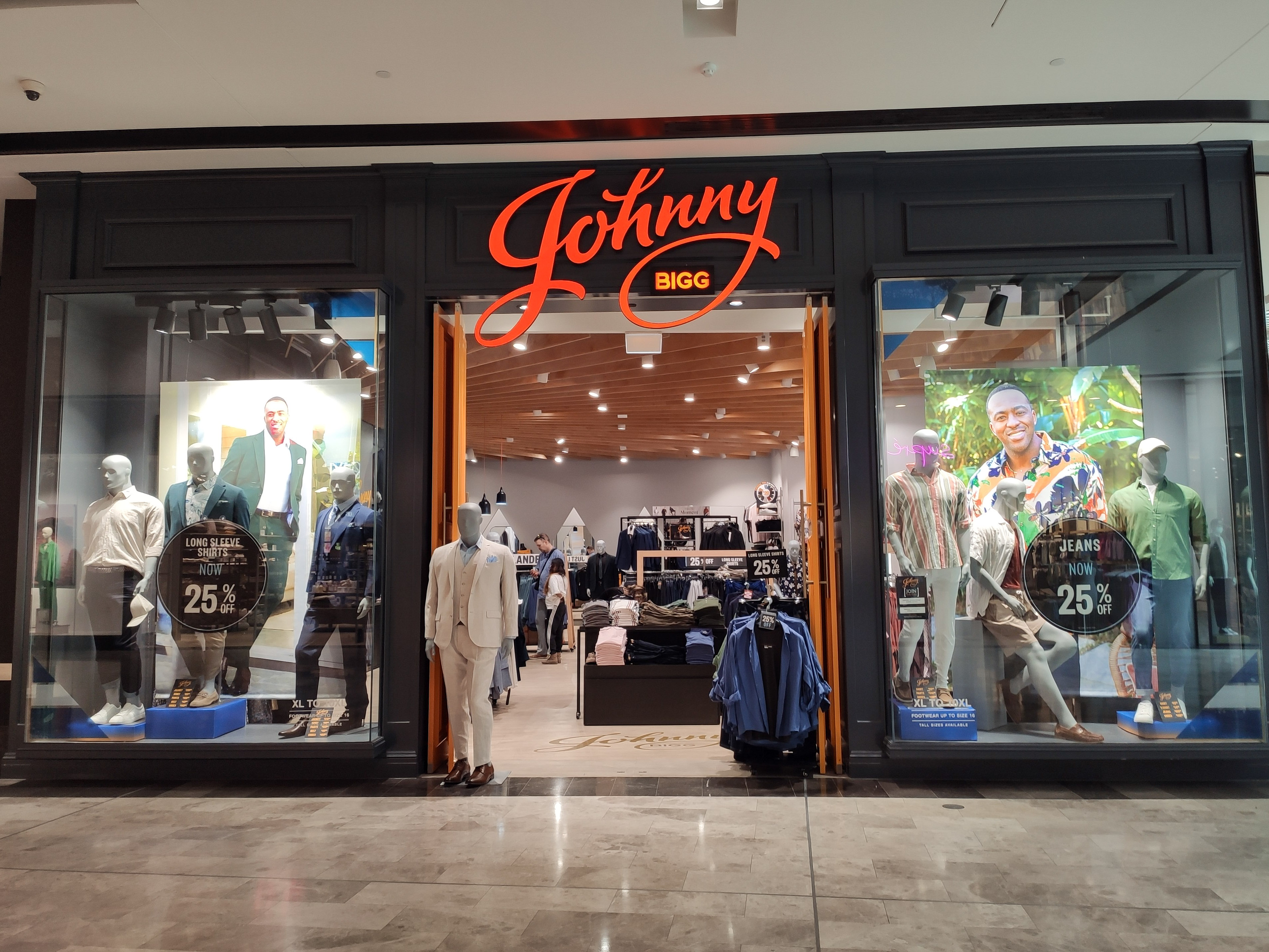
Johnny Bigg store in Westfield Carousel

Johnny Bigg is retail chain selling big and tall menswear.

There are 69 Johnny Bigg stores in Australia. There are ten stores in New Zealand, including four in Auckland.

=== Rockwear ===
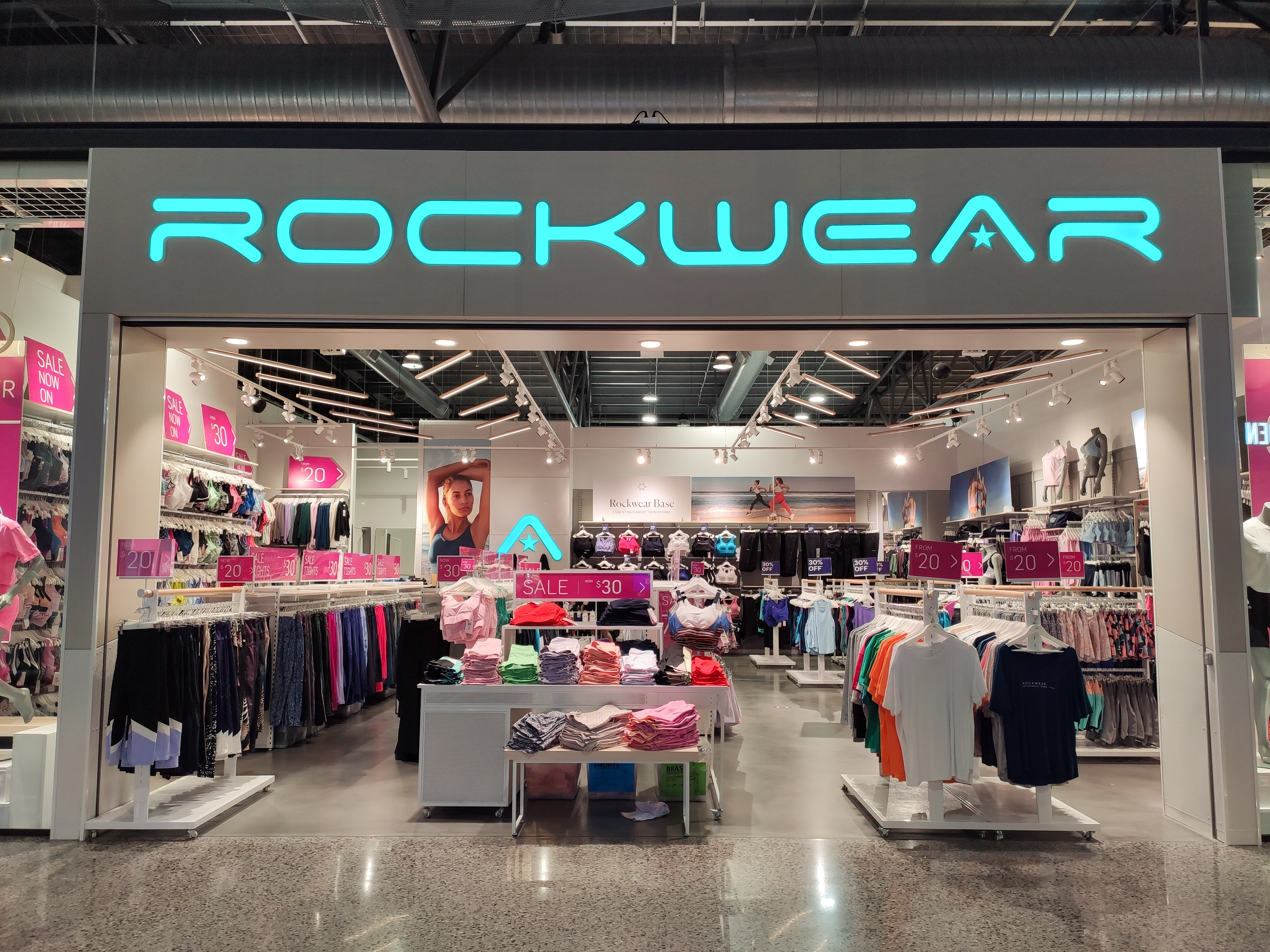
Rockwear store in DFO Perth

Rockwear is a women's active wear chain, selling clothes for exercise classes, walking, running and everyday use. It was founded in 1991 and acquired by Retail Apparel Group in 2015.

It has 73 stores around Australia.

=== AXL+Co ===
AXL+Co is a plus-sized menswear brand operating under the Connor brand. It launched online in July 2023 and opened its first physical store in Macarthur Square.

== History ==
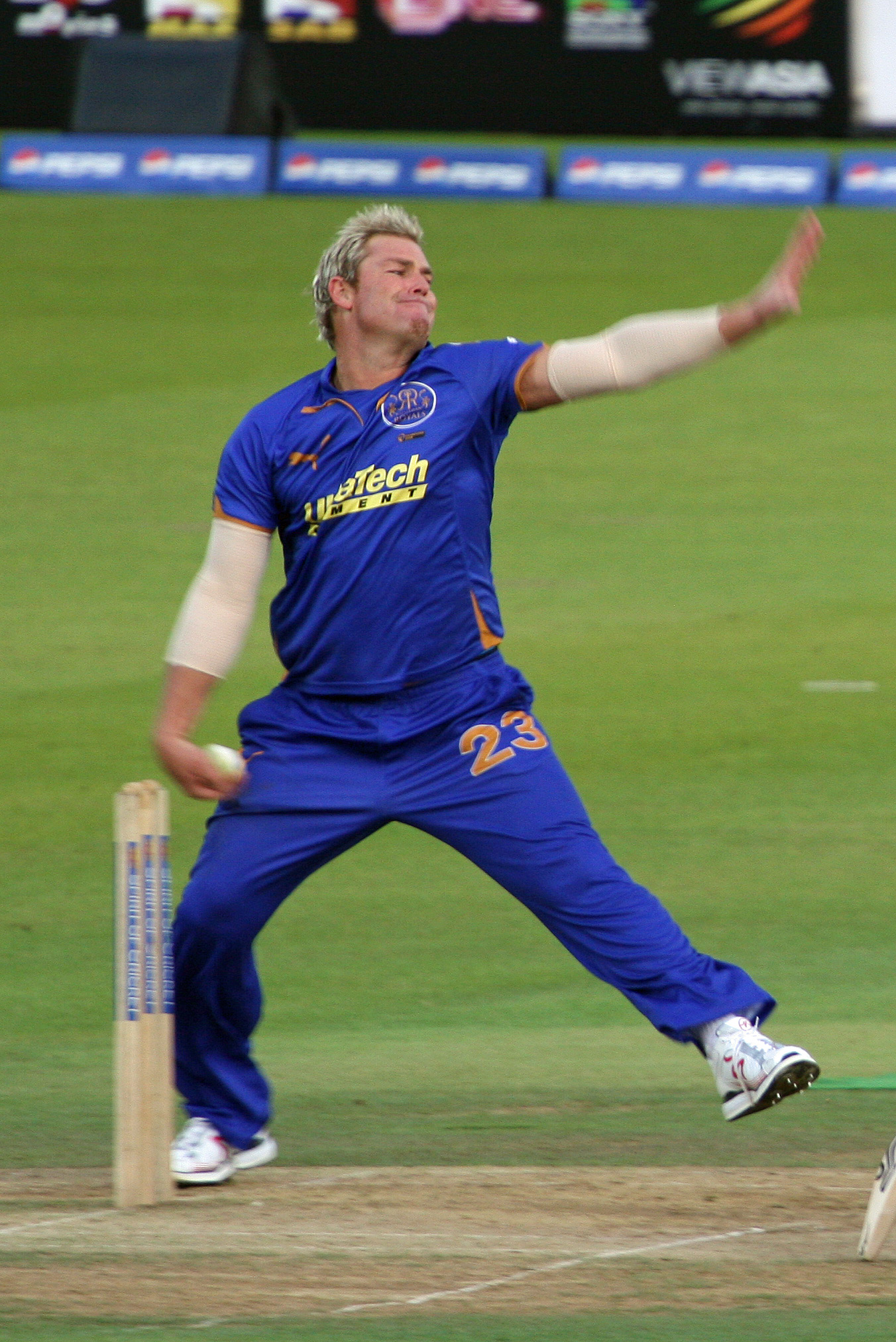
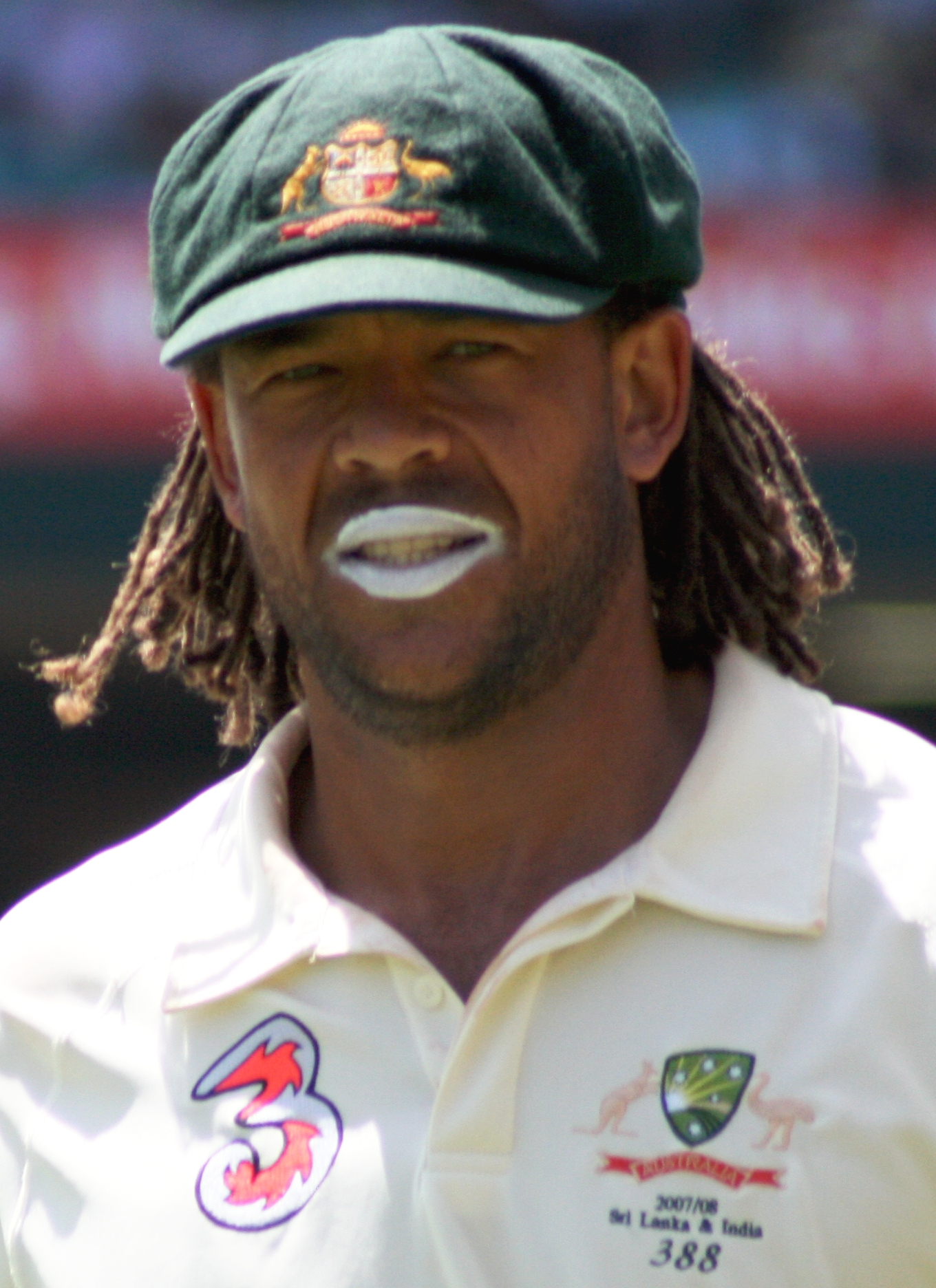
Shane Warne (top) and Andrew Symonds (bottom) have featured in Tarocash marketing campaigns.

=== Tarocash (1987–2007) ===
Brothers Stephen and Michael Leibowitz began supplying wholesale menswear to retail outlets, after immigrating from South Africa to Australia in 1987. The pair opened their first store, branded as Cafe, in 1988.

The brothers adopted the brand name Tarocash after the first two letters of their children's names: Taryn, Romi, Carly and Sasha. They had five stores by 1991.

In winter 2003, the company began to use players from the Canterbury Bulldogs, Wests Tigers and North Melbourne Football Club as models in its catalogues. Later that year, it recruited cricketers Matthew Hayden and Michael Bevan as models for its summer catalogue.

In 2004, private equity fund CHAMP invested $31 million to expand Tarocash in Australia and internationally.

Shane Warne signed a two-year contract worth almost AU$100,000 in May 2005 to become the face of Tarocash and appear in the retailer's catalogues. Warne was dropped from upcoming catalogues two months later, as the company reviewed whether its relationship with him.

The company did not rule out using fellow cricketer Andrew Symonds in future campaigns, after his recent all-night drinking session.

=== Retail Apparel Group (2007–2017) ===
In 2007, Tarocash had 86 stores and launched its second retail chain Connor. That year it also acquired yd. and established Retail Apparel Group to house the three companies it owned. In 2008, the company had 177 stores.

In 2014, the company had 325 stores, and launched its fourth retail chain, Johnny Bigg.

In 2015, the company had 342 stores and acquired Rockwear. Rockwear had established a network of stores across the Australian east coast since opening its first store in 1991.

The majority shareholder, Navis Capital Partners, slated the company for a AU$400 million initial public offering on the Australian Securities Exchange. It also started to assess buyer interest. At the time, the company was recording declining profit, due to moderate sales and rising import prices caused by the low Australian dollar.

In April 2017, in Australia, the average shopper was spending $56 at Johnny Bigg, $51 at Tarocash, $44 at yd., $32 at Rockwear and $31 at Connor. The company said the growth of online shopping and H&M was pushing down price expectations, and menswear was growing faster than womenswear.

=== The Foschini Group (2017–present) ===
The Foschini Group (TFG), a South African clothing company, purchased Retail Apparel Group from Navis Capital Partners for AU$302.5 million in 2017. Navis abandoned its IPO plans. Founding director Stephen Leibowitz also sold his share in the company to TFG, giving it 100% of the company.

Retail Apparel Group had 477 stores at the time of the sale in 2017, bringing Foschini's portfolio to above 3000 stores. TFG sought to grow the company quickly, seeking double-digit growth in 2019.

The COVID-19 pandemic affected revenue in 2020, and the company temporarily or permanently closed stores. However, TFG Australia's online sales surged, increasing 58.1% in the year to March 2021.

The company introduced the Rockwear brand in Western Australia in 2021, opening five stores across Perth over two months.

In 2021, Baptist World Aid Australia gave Retail Apparel Group a "B" grade for its efforts to become more ethical and sustainable.

In September 2021, the company warned of a disastrous year in 2022 as JobSeeker subsidies and rent waivers were lifted.

By 2022, the company's five brands had a combined 510 stores.

In 2023, Retail Apparel Group established AXL+Co, a plus-sized menswear brand operating under the Connor brand. In October 2025, Connor opened a store in Singapore, marking Retail Apparel Group's first expansion into Southeast Asia.

== Sponsorship ==
Retail Apparel Group has supported Thread Together, a network of mobile charity clothing vans in New South Wales, alongside Bendon Lingerie, Commonwealth Bank and the Goodman Foundation. The vans travel to Wagga Wagga, North Coast, South Coast and Greater Sydney.
