= Australian Liquor Marketers =

Australian multinational liquor store franchise owned by Metcash

- Type: Division
- Industry: Retail
- Headquarters: Australia
- Number of locations: About 2700 in Australia; 114 in New Zealand
- Area served: Australia, New Zealand
- Products: Liquor stores
- Parent: Metcash
- Website: www.almliquor.com.au www.tasmanliquor.co.nz

Australian Liquor Marketers is the liquor arm of Metcash. It distributes liquor to businesses around Australia and New Zealand, and runs a franchise of almost 2900 liquor stores operating as The Bottle-O, Cellarbrations, IGA Liquor, Duncans, Thirsty Camel, Big Bargain, Porters and Merchants Liquor.

The company has 13 distribution centres across every state and territory of Australia, and a distribution centre in New Zealand. It is Australia's largest supplier of liquor to independently owned liquor retailers and largest broad-range liquor wholesaler, supplying to 12,000 liquor customers.

== Independent Brands Australia ==
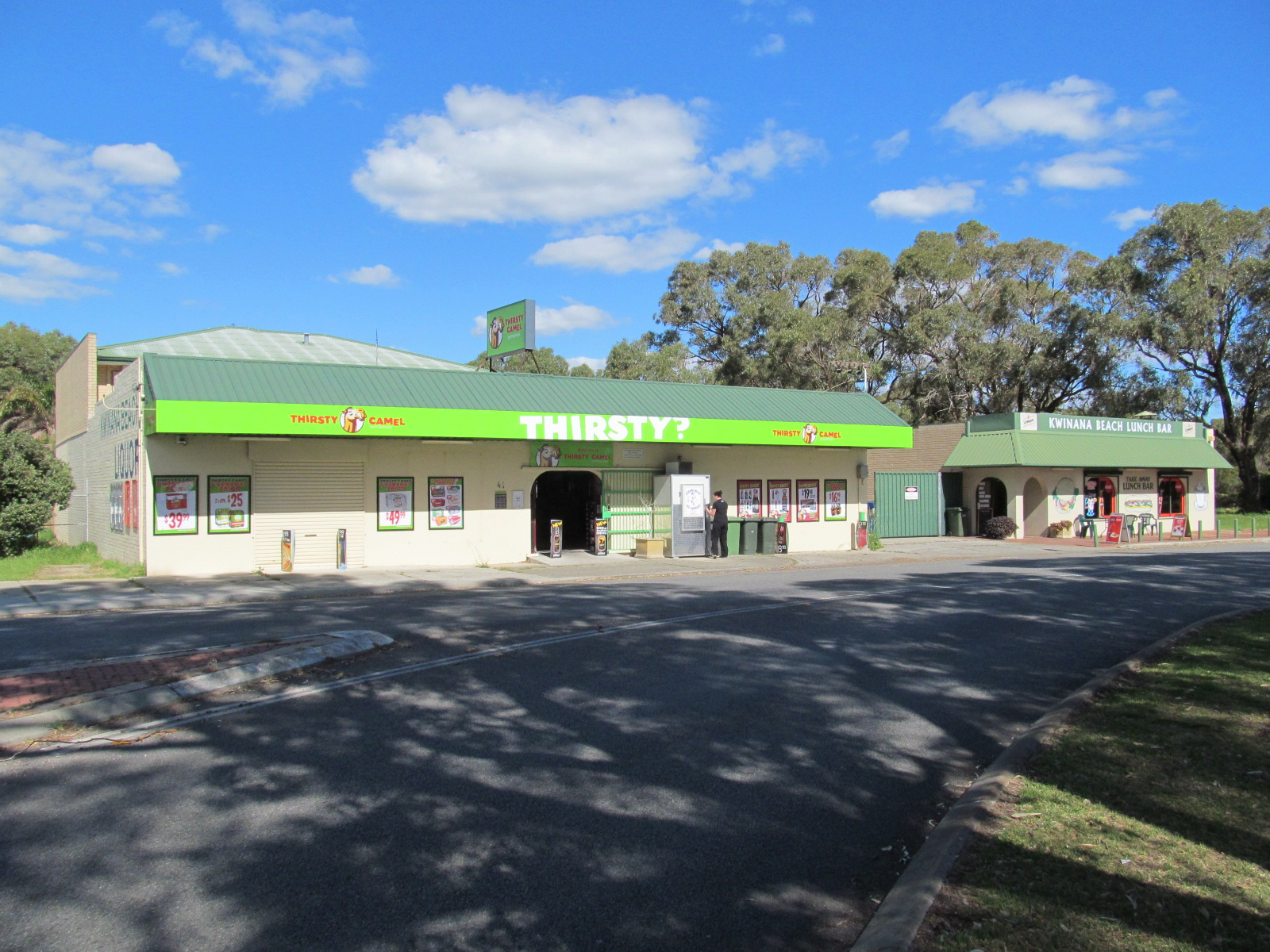
Thirsty Camel store in Kwinana Beach

Independent Brands Australia is the second-largest network of liquor retail outlets in Australia. It has about 2,700 stores operating as Cellarbrations, The Bottle O, IGA liquor, Duncan's Liquor, Thirsty Camel, Big Bargain Liquor and Porter's Liquor.

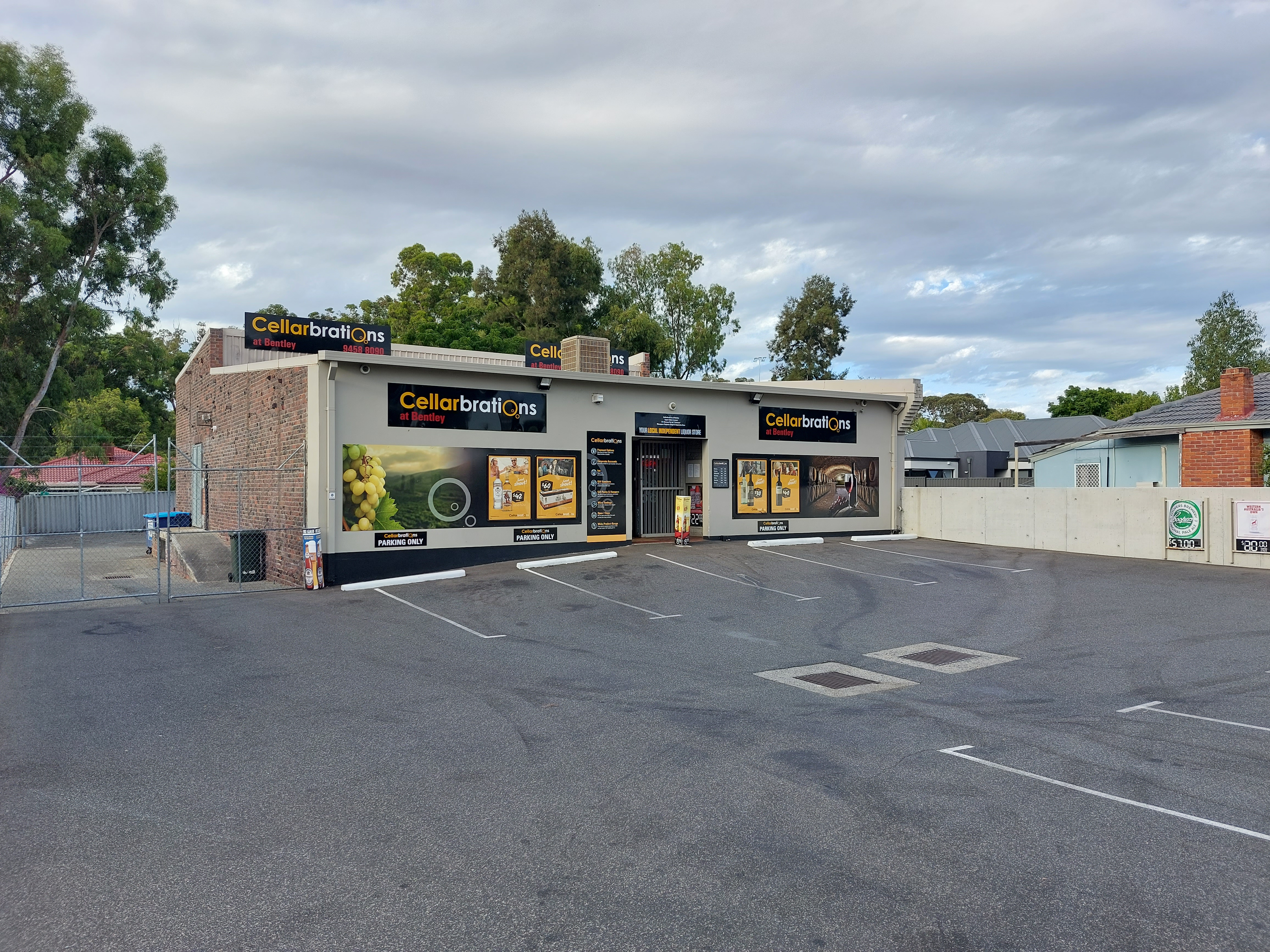
Cellarbrations store in Bentley

== Tasman Liquor Company ==
Tasman Liquor Company is based in Wiri, Auckland. It has 114 franchisees around New Zealand operating as The Bottle O and Merchants Liquor, including 36 in the Auckland Region.

=== History ===
In 2020 the company was accused of failing to address migrant worker exploitation by some of its franchisees. One former owner of 12 stores failed 19 Ministry of Business, Innovation and Employment inspections; one former worker accused him of "modern day slavery". Tasman Liquor said it did not support the practices, and would comply with authorities.

== Liquor Centre ==
Liquor Centre is a New Zealand liquor franchiser founded in 1992.

It claims to be the largest liquor store network in New Zealand, with 240 stores around the country. There are 175 Liquor Centre stores and 41 Liquor Spot stores listed on the company's website. The remaining stores are part of the buying network but do not have branding. Within the Auckland region there are 71 branded stores, including 41 Liquor Centre stores and 29 Liquor Spot stores.

Tasman Liquor Company supplies liquor to stores in the Liquor Centre network. Metcash purchased the franchise itself in June 2020, one of a group of acquisitions it was making at the time. Metcash told shareholders the purchase was a "bolt-on" acquisition to add to its existing liquor portfolio, significantly expanding its retail network in New Zealand.

=== History ===
In 2019, the owners of the Grafton, Auckland Liquor Spot store were ordered to pay almost NZ$200,000 in penalties and arrears to staff for breaches of labour laws.

In November 2020, the Ministry of Business, Innovation and Employment secured a freezing order to stop the owners of four Bay of Plenty stores from selling stores while it sought penalties for serious breaches to labour laws.

In March 2021, the Royal Oak, Auckland store joined UberEats in a trial of alcohol delivery.
