= Glassons =

Fashion retail brand in Australia & New Zealand

GLASSONS
- Type: Public
- Industry: Fashion Retail
- Founded: 1918
- Headquarters: Sydney, Australia and Auckland, New Zealand
- Number of locations: 76
- Products: Clothing Accessories Shoes
- Parent: Hallensteins Glassons
- Website: glassons.com

Glassons is a women's fashion retail brand within the Hallenstein Glassons retail group. Glassons offers on-trend, quality women's clothing at affordable prices. Glassons is headquartered in Sydney, Australia and Auckland, New Zealand; operating 42 stores in Australia and 34 in New Zealand.

== History ==
Glassons was founded in Christchurch, New Zealand in 1918 by J.H. Glasson as a mail order clothing manufacturer. In 1985, Glassons merged with men's fashion retailer Hallensteins to form Hallensteins Glassons Group before opening in Australia in the 90s.

== Products ==
Glassons offers a range of fashion products and accessories targeted towards women aged 18-30 years old.
