= Hallensteins Glassons =

New Zealand fashion retail company

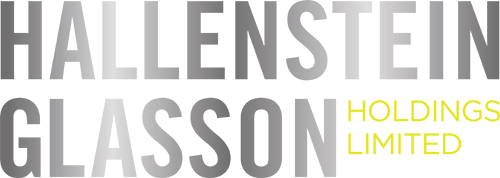
- Type: Public
- Traded as: NZX: HLG
- Industry: Retail; Fashion; Clothing
- Founded: 1873; 153 years ago
- Headquarters: Auckland, New Zealand
- Area served: New Zealand, Australia
- Products: Clothes, apparel, accessories, personal care, footwear
- Website: www.hallensteinglasson.co.nz www.hallensteins.com www.glassons.com

Hallensteins Glassons is a New Zealand fashion company based in Auckland, with stores in New Zealand and Australia.

== Brands ==
=== Hallensteins ===
Hallensteins (or Hallenstein Brothers) is a men's fashion, street and lifestyle retailer. It sells a range of men's fashion, clothing, footwear and accessories, ranging from street and lifestyle wear to contemporary formal dress. The company also designs and produces the in-house brands Hallensteins and HBrothers. It has 46 stores across New Zealand and Australia, including 12 in Auckland.

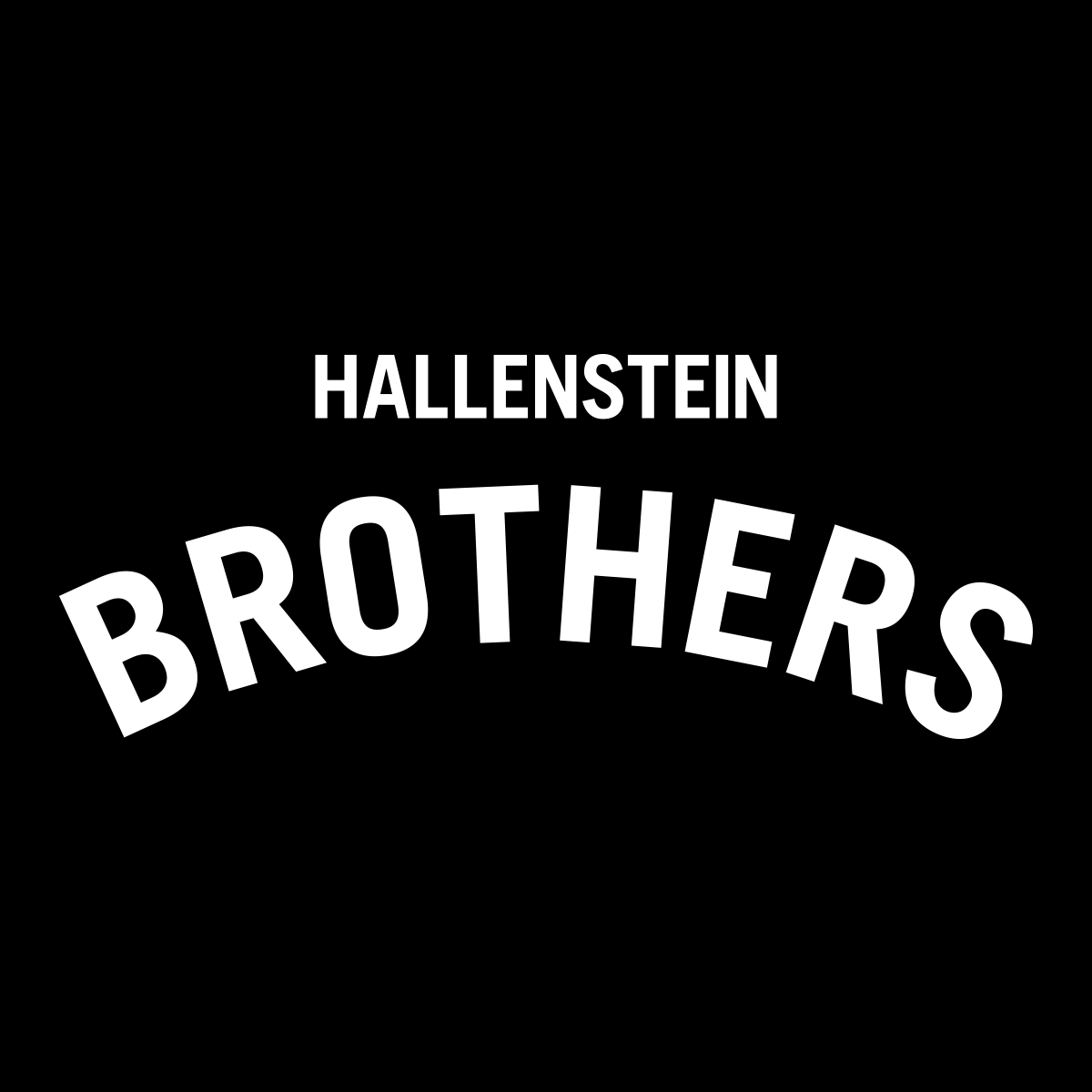
Hallenstein Brothers logo

=== Glassons ===
Glassons is a women's fashion retailers, selling a range of women's clothing and swimwear. It has 72 stores, including 12 in Auckland.

=== Ekocycle ===
Hallenstein Brothers is a stockist, designer and developer of Ekocycle, a line of environmentally conscious suits crafted by using a blend of recycled materials, sophisticated shapes and refined cuts. The Hallenstein Brothers brand HBrothers, The Coca-Cola Corporation and musician Will.i.am developed the Ekocycle project as an investment in and exploration of the future of international sustainable and environmentally friendly retailing.

In 2015 the HBrothers brand in conjunction with Harrods launched an exclusive new range in further support of the Ekocycle line.

== History ==
Hallenstein Glasson Holdings Limited was formed in 1985 through the merger between Hallensteins and Glassons.

During the initial COVID-19 pandemic in New Zealand, Hallensteins Glassons staff received $5.18 million in wage subsidies from the New Zealand Government, with $2.48 million going to staff in Hallenstein Brothers stores. The company posted $28 million in profit in the 2019-20 financial year and paid a dividend to shareholders, but did not repay the subsidy.

=== Hallensteins ===
Bendix Hallenstein established his first clothing and department store at The Octagon, Dunedin in 1876. By 1900, Hallensteins had 34 stores.

In 2017, Hallensteins had 42 stores.

Hallenstein Brothers has launched several campaigns featuring collaborations between musicians The Script filmed in Cuba and motocross rider Carey Hart filmed at the Bonneville Salt Flats. In 2019 the company launched a campaign with model Laura Evans at the forefront, inviting women to wear their skinny fit suits.

=== Glassons ===
Glassons was founded in Christchurch in 1918 by JH Glasson, later joined by his brother CV Glasson. The business was originally a mail-order clothing supplier, but began manufacturing its own clothing, with a focus on womenswear. The original Glassons store operated as a warehouse, selling to the public below retail pricing. Through the mid-20th century, the business expanded to sell clothing for all ages and genders.

In 1958 the business was taken over by JV Glasson, son of the founder. He expanded Glassons to multiple stores in Christchurch. RD Glasson - the widow of JV Glasson - took over the business in 1964. Her son Tim Glasson took over the business in the 1960s and transformed Glassons into a women's fashion retailer with relatively inexpensive pricing. Throughout the later decades of the 20th century, Glassons expanded around New Zealand and to Australia.
