= Nobel (Australia) =

Australian subsidiary of Nobel Industries

Nobel (Australia) Pty Ltd
- Formerly: Nobel (Australasia) Ltd
- Type: Subsidiary
- Industry: Explosives; industrial chemicals; fertilisers
- Founded: 1897 (as Nobel (Australasia) Ltd); predecessor works established 1875
- Fate: Fertiliser interests amalgamated into Commonwealth Fertilisers and Chemicals (1929); explosives and chemical operations later absorbed into ICIANZ
- Headquarters: Deer Park, Melbourne, Victoria, Australia
- Area served: Australia
- Products: Dynamite and blasting agents; black powder; sulphuric acid; superphosphate
- Parent: Nobel’s Explosives Co. (later Nobel Industries); subsequently Imperial Chemical Industries (via ICIANZ)

Nobel (Australia) Pty Ltd (contemporaneously often styled Nobel (Australasia) Pty Ltd) was the Australian arm of the British explosives and chemicals enterprise founded by Alfred Nobel. It operated major works at Deer Park on Melbourne’s western fringe, supplying dynamite and other blasting agents to mining and construction, and manufacturing acids and fertilisers (including superphosphate) for agriculture.

Contemporary press frequently referred to the company—and to accidents at the site—as “Nobel (Australasia) Pty Ltd” or “Nobel (Australia) Pty Ltd”, underscoring that both forms were in use for the Deer Park concern.

Nobel’s fertiliser interests in Victoria were merged in October 1929 with Cuming, Smith & Co., Wischers Pty Ltd, and the Mount Lyell Mining and Railway Company to form Commonwealth Fertilisers and Chemicals Pty Ltd, a consolidation reported at the time as controlling a majority of the State’s trade.

Following the creation of Imperial Chemical Industries (ICI) in Britain in 1926, the Australian explosives and chemicals businesses associated with Nobel were progressively integrated into ICIANZ. Contemporary heritage and industrial histories identify the Deer Park works as one of the principal sites brought under ICIANZ management in the late 1920s.

== Origins and establishment in Australia ==
The Deer Park site on Melbourne’s western fringe became an early centre of explosives manufacture in Victoria. In the mid-1870s, Jones, Scott & Co. established a dynamite works beside Kororoit Creek, a location chosen for its isolation from housing and access to mining districts; manufacture is recorded as commencing in 1874–75, with operations dated to May 1876 by other authorities.

In 1897 Nobel Industries, via the Nobel Dynamite Trust, acquired the Deer Park explosives works, establishing Nobel (Australasia) Ltd, later styled Nobel (Australia) Pty Ltd. Under Nobel’s direction, the factory expanded production from dynamite and nitroglycerine-based explosives to include sulphuric acid and related chemicals. The facility remained Australia’s principal—and for much of its history, only—commercial manufacturer of high explosives.

The importance of the factory was underscored in March 1931 when a lightning strike ignited approximately 3,000 lb of nitroglycerin at Nobel (Australasia) Pty Ltd’s Deer Park facility. The resulting explosion caused no casualties but shattered windows in nearby suburbs and was felt as far as Oakleigh, highlighting both the scale and the hazards of the operation.

== Fertilisers and chemical diversification ==
By the early twentieth century, Nobel (Australia) had diversified its production to include sulphuric acid and superphosphate fertilisers, addressing growing demand across south-eastern Australia. This shift mirrored the agricultural transformation of the period—farmers increasingly applied superphosphate to counter nutrient-poor soils as western Victoria’s farming industries expanded.

Nobel’s Australian operations reflected its parent company’s global strategy of integrating explosives and chemical manufacture. Fertiliser production at Deer Park depended on sulphuric acid already being generated for explosives, with other by-products channelled into a wider range of industrial chemicals.

By the 1920s, Nobel (Australia) was recognised not only as a supplier to the mining sector but as a contributor to Australian agricultural productivity, positioning itself as a strategic partner in the fertiliser trade.

== Merger into Commonwealth Fertilisers and Chemicals (1929) ==
In October 1929 Nobel (Australia) amalgamated its fertiliser interests with those of Cuming, Smith & Co., Wischers Pty Ltd, and the Mount Lyell Mining and Railway Company, creating the new entity Commonwealth Fertilisers and Chemicals Pty Ltd (CF&C).

The merger created a company with approximately £2.5 million in paid capital, making it one of the largest consolidations in the Australian fertiliser industry of the era. Nobel’s allocation comprised £213,312 in preference and ordinary shares, a substantial holding within the new enterprise. Modern economic comparisons suggest this represented the equivalent of AUD $20–30 million in 2025 prices by inflation alone, or over AUD $150 million when assessed against relative GDP share.

The agreement rationalised production at major plants in Yarraville (Cuming Smith) and Port Melbourne, while smaller works were closed. Nobel’s involvement provided both international technical expertise and local capacity in sulphuric acid manufacture, which was essential to superphosphate production.

Contemporary newspapers noted that the amalgamation was expected to command over half of Victoria’s fertiliser market, placing CF&C in a dominant position regionally.

== Absorption into ICIANZ ==
Following the creation of Imperial Chemical Industries (ICI) in Britain in 1926 through the merger of Nobel Industries, Brunner Mond, United Alkali, and British Dyestuffs, the Australian operations of Nobel were reorganised. Nobel (Australia) became part of the newly incorporated Imperial Chemical Industries of Australia and New Zealand (ICIANZ) in 1928, consolidating explosives, fertiliser, and chemical production under the new regional subsidiary.

This integration positioned ICIANZ as one of the largest manufacturing companies in Australasia, with Nobel’s Deer Park explosives factory and fertiliser operations at Yarraville forming key parts of its industrial base. Nobel’s name gradually disappeared from public use in Australia, but its technology, workforce, and facilities were carried into ICIANZ’s diversified operations.

== Legacy ==
The absorption of Nobel (Australia) into ICIANZ marked the disappearance of the Nobel brand in the Australasian market. Its explosives and fertiliser operations nevertheless formed a substantial part of ICIANZ’s industrial base, particularly in mining and agriculture.

Following the 1998 restructuring of ICI’s global operations, Imperial Chemical Industries Australia and New Zealand (ICIANZ) was rebranded as Orica, preserving its explosives and fertiliser legacy as an independent Australian multinational.

Industrial heritage studies note Nobel (Australia) among the group of firms that provided the technological and financial foundation for ICIANZ’s long dominance of the Australian chemical sector.

== See also ==
- Commonwealth Fertilisers and Chemicals
- Cuming, Smith & Co.
- Wischers Pty Ltd
- Mount Lyell Mining and Railway Company
- Imperial Chemical Industries
- ICIANZ
- Orica
