= Wischer & Co. =

Victorian fertiliser and chemical-manure manufacturer (c.1880s–1929)

Wischer & Co. Pty. Ltd.
- Type: Private
- Industry: Fertilisers, chemicals
- Founded: c. 1880s-1890s (as Wischer and Co.)
- Founder: Wischer family (proprietors)
- Defunct: 1929
- Fate: Amalgamated into Commonwealth Fertilisers and Chemicals
- Headquarters: Melbourne, Victoria
- Area served: Victoria; wider Australia
- Products: Superphosphate, bone manures, chemical manures

Wischer & Co. Pty. Ltd. was an Australian fertiliser and chemical company active in the late nineteenth and early twentieth centuries. The firm was a local competitor to Cuming, Smith & Co. and other suppliers of superphosphate and acid for agricultural markets. It maintained manufacturing operations in Melbourne, producing chemical manures used by grain and pasture farmers across Victoria. Manufacturing began at their purpose-built factory in Footscray during the second half of 1896.

Advertisements and reports in the 1890s indicate that Wischers was regarded as one of the principal producers of chemical manures in the state of Victoria alongside Cuming Smith, Mount Lyell, and other rivals. Its products were widely marketed to cereal growers, reflecting the growing importance of fertilisers in counteracting the nutrient-poor soils of south-eastern Australia.

In 1929, Wischer & Co. was one of four Victoria based firms consolidated into the newly formed Commonwealth Fertilisers and Chemicals, alongside Cuming Smith & Co., Mount Lyell Mining & Railway Company, and Nobel (Australia) Ltd. The merger rationalised production into larger facilities at Yarraville and Port Melbourne, and Wischers’ independent operations ceased thereafter.

== History ==
German-born manufacturer Wilhelm H. Wischer had emigrated from Magdeburg with his wife Marie, and established a chemical and fertiliser works at Yarraville in the late 1890s; the partnership was incorporated as Wischer & Co. Pty Ltd during that period. Messrs. Wischer & Co. exhibited prominently at the 1900 regional show, boasting high-phosphoric superphosphate and noting “no difficulty in disposing of their manufactures” due to strong demand.

A period photograph held by the Footscray Historical Society depicts the Yarraville works (large sheds and chimney) circa 1900, corroborating the site’s industrial scale.

A subsequent supplement in The Leader (Melbourne) (a widely read Melbourne weekly of the era) highlighted Wischers’ broad product line—including acids, dips, and disinfectants—and anticipation of “a record output” in meeting growing demand.

Wischer's, along with Cumming, Smith & Co; the Mount Lyall Company and the Australian Explosives company were involved in a 1904 commission, where they were raised the issue that they could not get their products to New South Wales.

In November 1915, firefighters were called to Wischer's superphosphate works in Yarraville, where they found a 50-ton stack of phosphate smouldering which caused health issues for the firefighters.

In 1918, Wischer's and Rosenhaim & Co lost a legal case brought by Faulkner, where the companies were found to be negligent in transporting a dangerous product in earthenware jars and had to pay damages. The Supreme Court of Victoria officially stated There is a duty in any person sending forth an inherently dangerous thing towards third parties likely to have to do with it in the condition in which he leaves it.

== Merger into Commonwealth Fertilisers and Chemicals ==
In October 1929, Wischer & Co. was one of four major firms—alongside Cuming, Smith & Co., the Mount Lyell Mining and Railway Company, and Nobel (Australia) Pty Ltd—that amalgamated to form Commonwealth Fertilisers and Chemicals Pty Ltd.

The merger was part of a broader push to consolidate the fertiliser industry amidst the pressures of increasing agricultural demand and economic uncertainty. It created a single entity with approximately £2.5 million in paid capital, enabling streamlined operations and greater production capacity. Notably, Wischer & Co. was allocated £1 preference shares valued at £116,549 and £1 ordinary shares totaling 244,753, together £361,302—a substantial allocation reflecting its industrial presence. In modern terms, estimates of this sum vary: simple inflation suggests approximately AUD 35–40 million in 2025, while broader measures of relative wealth place it closer to AUD 276 million (about US$181 million).

A contemporary report declared: “The new organisation absorbed the talent of its four components and is expected to command close to 55 per cent of Victoria’s fertiliser market.”

Production was centralized at Cuming Smith's large Yarraville works, and smaller operations—including those of Wischers—were gradually phased out. While Cuming Smith maintained a controlling interest and leadership, Wischers’ sizeable share indicates its significant role as a supplier to regional agriculture. The merger marked the end of Wischers' independent operations, but ensured its infrastructure and market channels were integrated into an entity that became a dominant force in Australian fertiliser manufacturing.

== Legacy ==
Following the 1929 merger, the Wischer & Co. name gradually disappeared from the fertiliser trade, but its manufacturing capacity, distribution networks, and customer base were absorbed into Commonwealth Fertilisers and Chemicals and, subsequently, into ICIANZ.

The company's role in the amalgamation demonstrates how established mid-sized firms were essential building blocks in the consolidation of Australia's fertiliser industry. In particular, Wischer & Co. provided recognised brand presence and distribution reach in Victoria at a time when agricultural demand for superphosphate was rapidly expanding.

By the mid-twentieth century, these consolidations left the Australian fertiliser market dominated by a small number of large entities, with Wischers remembered primarily through its contribution to that process rather than as a continuing brand. Industrial heritage studies of Yarraville and Melbourne's western suburbs often identify firms such as Wischer & Co. as examples of the second-tier chemical manufacturers that helped shape the region's industrial character.

In later Australian case law, Faulkner v Wischer & Co Pty Ltd (1918 VLR 513) was repeatedly cited as establishing the high duty of care required of suppliers of dangerous chemicals, including by the High Court in Adelaide Chemical & Fertilizer Co Ltd v Carlyle (1940) 64 CLR 514.

== See also ==
- Commonwealth Fertilisers and Chemicals
- Cuming, Smith & Co.
- Mount Lyell Mining and Railway Company
- Nobel (Australia) Pty Ltd
- Fertiliser industry in Australia
