= Wesfarmers Chemicals, Energy & Fertilisers =

Company based in Perth, Western Australia

- Company type: Division of Wesfarmers Limited
- Industry: Chemicals, fertilisers, energy
- Founded: 1984
- Headquarters: Perth, Western Australia
- Key people: Aaron Hood (Managing Director) 2024 - current; Ian Hansen (Managing Director) 2017-2024
- Products: Fertilisers, chemicals, gas, energy products
- Number of employees: 1,500+ (2021)
- Parent: Wesfarmers
- Website: www.wescef.com.au

Wesfarmers Chemicals, Energy & Fertilisers (WesCEF) is a division of Wesfarmers Limited based in Perth, Western Australia. It produces and markets chemical, fertiliser and energy products through businesses including CSBP, Kleenheat, Australian Vinyls and ModWood, and joint ventures such as Australian Gold Reagents (AGR), Queensland Nitrates (QNP) and Covalent Lithium.

== History ==
WesCEF traces its origins to Wesfarmers’ acquisition of control of CSBP & Farmers. Wesfarmers announced a $60 million bid on 25 October 1977 and secured the required 75 per cent vote on 11 September 1979; contemporary coverage described it as the largest corporate takeover in Australia's history to date. In 1986 Wesfarmers bought BP’s remaining stake, gaining 100 per cent ownership of CSBP & Farmers.

Kleenheat Gas had been established by Wesfarmers in 1956 to distribute LPG in Western Australia, forming the foundation of the group’s energy activities. Mining chemicals capacity expanded with the commissioning in 1988 of the Australian Gold Reagents sodium cyanide plant at Kwinana, a joint venture owned 75% by CSBP and 25% by Coogee Chemicals.

== Operations ==
WesCEF’s portfolio includes:

- CSBP: manufactures, imports and distributes fertilisers for Western Australian agriculture, and produces industrial chemicals including explosive-grade ammonium nitrate and sodium cyanide at Kwinana.
- Kleenheat Gas: natural-gas retailing in Western Australia and the Northern Territory; in 2024 WesCEF sold Kleenheat’s LPG distribution business to Supagas, with the Kwinana LPG Production Facility remaining in Kleenheat and wholesaling LPG to WA distributors.
- Australian Gold Reagents (AGR): sodium-cyanide manufacturing venture at Kwinana owned 75% by CSBP and 25% by Coogee Chemicals, supplying the gold sector.
- Queensland Nitrates (QNP): 50:50 joint venture between CSBP and Dyno Nobel producing ammonia and ammonium nitrate near Moura, Queensland.
- Covalent Lithium: 50:50 Wesfarmers–SQM joint venture developing the Mount Holland lithium mine and concentrator and an integrated lithium-hydroxide refinery at Kwinana.
- Australian Vinyls / ModWood: PVC resin supply (Australian Vinyls) and wood-plastic composite products (ModWood). ModWood is owned by AVC Holdings, which CSBP acquired with Australian Vinyls in 2007.

== Workforce and impact ==
As of FY2022 WesCEF reported “more than 1,400” employees across its operations; current corporate material states the division employs approximately 1,500 people nationally. At Kwinana, CSBP’s complex alone employs more than 600 people.

WesCEF businesses supply Australian agriculture, mining and energy markets, with selected products exported to international customers. Sodium cyanide produced by Australian Gold Reagents (AGR) at Kwinana is shipped to more than 25 countries across South-East Asia, Africa, the Americas and the Middle East.

== Sustainability and Environmental Initiatives ==
In 2025, WesCEF installed advanced abatement catalysts at its nitric acid ammonium nitrate (NAAN) plant in Kwinana, achieving a 98% reduction in nitrous oxide emissions. This technology converts greenhouse gases into less harmful substances and has abated over 10 million tonnes of carbon dioxide equivalent since 2012. WesCEF plans to extend similar technology to two older NAAN plants by 2030.

WesCEF is also exploring renewable ammonia production through a partnership with APA Group. A feasibility study involves supplying renewable hydrogen via the repurposed Parmelia Gas Pipeline to decarbonize the existing 300,000-tonne-per-year ammonia plant in Kwinana, with potential expansion to an additional 300,000 tonnes. The project includes phased electrolysis capacity up to 900 MW.

== See also ==
- Wesfarmers
- Cuming, Smith & Co.
- Incitec Pivot
- Fertiliser industry in Australia
