= Robert Burns Cuming =

Australian chemical manufacturer and local politician

- Born: 1859; Melbourne, Colony of Victoria
- Died: May 5, 1910 (aged 51); Torrensville, South Australia
- Occupation(s): Industrialist; mayor
- Known for: Founding the Adelaide Chemical Works (1882)
- Spouse: Elizabeth Cleghorn (c.1861–1918)
- Relatives: James Cuming (1835–1911), father; James Cuming (1861–1920), brother

Robert Burns Cuming (1859–1910) was an Australian industrialist who founded the Adelaide Chemical Works in 1882 and helped establish South Australia’s superphosphate industry. He served as a councillor and mayor of Thebarton (1893–94; 1901–03).

== Early life ==
Born in Melbourne in 1859, Cuming was the eldest son of Scottish-born industrialist James Cuming (1835–1911). He entered the family’s chemicals and fertilisers enterprise in Victoria before being tasked to establish a South Australian branch.

== Career ==
Cuming established the Adelaide Chemical Works on a 5½-acre site at New Thebarton (later Torrensville) in 1882, initially focused on sulphuric acid and from 1884 on superphosphate. A second plant opened at Port Adelaide in 1900 as bulk phosphate rock shipments commenced in 1901, enabling larger-scale manufacture for regional agriculture.

== Public life ==
Cuming served on Thebarton council in 1885–87, 1890–94 and 1899–1900 and was elected mayor in 1893–94 and again in 1901–03. Contemporary reports record his 1901 mayoral election and 1902 re-election; council and local histories confirm his 1893–94 term.

He was active in the Adelaide Chamber of Manufactures, serving as president in 1906–07.

== Death and legacy ==
His works became part of South Australia’s early fertiliser industry and later consolidations in the sector.

After a prolonged illness, Cuming died at his home, ‘Burn Brae’, Meyer Street, Torrensville, on 5 May 1910. Obituaries described him as a prominent Adelaide businessman. Cuming Street (Mile End, laid out 1903) commemorates his contribution.

== See also ==
- Adelaide Chemical Works
- Cuming, Smith & Co.
