= Pivot (company) =

Former Victorian fertiliser co-operative, merged into Incitec Pivot in 2003

Pivot Limited
- Type: Co-operative (later public)
- Industry: Fertilisers
- Founded: 1919
- Defunct: 2003 (merged into Incitec Pivot)
- Fate: Merged with Incitec Fertilisers
- Successor: Incitec Pivot
- Headquarters: Melbourne, Victoria, Australia
- Products: Superphosphate, mixed fertilisers

Pivot Limited was an Australian fertiliser co-operative founded in 1919 in Victoria. Established to secure affordable fertilisers for farmers, it grew into one of the state's principal fertiliser suppliers. In 2003 it merged with Incitec Fertilisers of Queensland to form Incitec Pivot, listed on the Australian Securities Exchange.

== History ==
Pivot Limited was founded in 1919 by a group of Victorian farmers to counter the high cost of fertilisers and ensure reliable supply. Operating as a co-operative, it distributed superphosphate and other fertiliser products to its members at competitive rates.

Over the decades the co-operative developed a vertically integrated manufacturing and distribution base in Victoria. Founded in 1919 as The Phosphate Co-operative Company of Australia Limited to secure cheaper phosphates for Victorian farmers, it promoted bulk purchase and supply arrangements from the outset.

By the mid-1920s the co-operative established a major superphosphate works at North Shore, Geelong, with rail sidings and a planned deep-water wharf on Corio Bay to receive imported phosphate rock. Contemporary coverage described production of Pivot superphosphate at the site, detailing the process from imported rock to finished fertiliser, and period photography shows ships alongside the company’s wharf and large phosphate stockpiles.

Demand growth through the 1930s drove successive capacity increases. Annual meetings reported “sales doubled” and extensions to the works, with continued rises in output at decade’s end. Post-war reports in the 1950s show the business trading profitably with growing paid capital, reflecting its established position in Victoria’s fertiliser market.

By the late twentieth century Pivot had become a principal Victorian manufacturer and distributor and a direct rival to Queensland-based Incitec Fertilisers. In its 2002 review of the proposed merger the Australian Competition and Consumer Commission described Incitec and Pivot as “the two largest manufacturers and suppliers of fertiliser products in Australia”. The companies announced their intention to merge in August 2002, executed a Merger Implementation Deed in February 2003, and on 1 June 2003 completed the transaction to form Incitec Pivot Limited.

In July 2003, Pivot merged with Incitec Fertilisers to form Incitec Pivot, creating Australia's largest fertiliser supplier and an integrated national operation.

== Products ==
Pivot supplied a range of fertiliser products to Victorian and southern New South Wales farmers, including superphosphate, potash mixes, and blended fertilisers. Its co-operative model emphasised bulk supply to the agricultural sector.

== Legacy ==
The co-operative heritage of Pivot Limited continued within Incitec Pivot Fertilisers, a division of Incitec Pivot Limited, which remains a major supplier of fertilisers across Australia.

== See also ==
- Incitec Pivot
- Incitec Fertilisers
- Commonwealth Fertilisers and Chemicals
- Cuming, Smith & Co.
