= Nitedals Krudtværk =

Former Norwegian gunpowder works

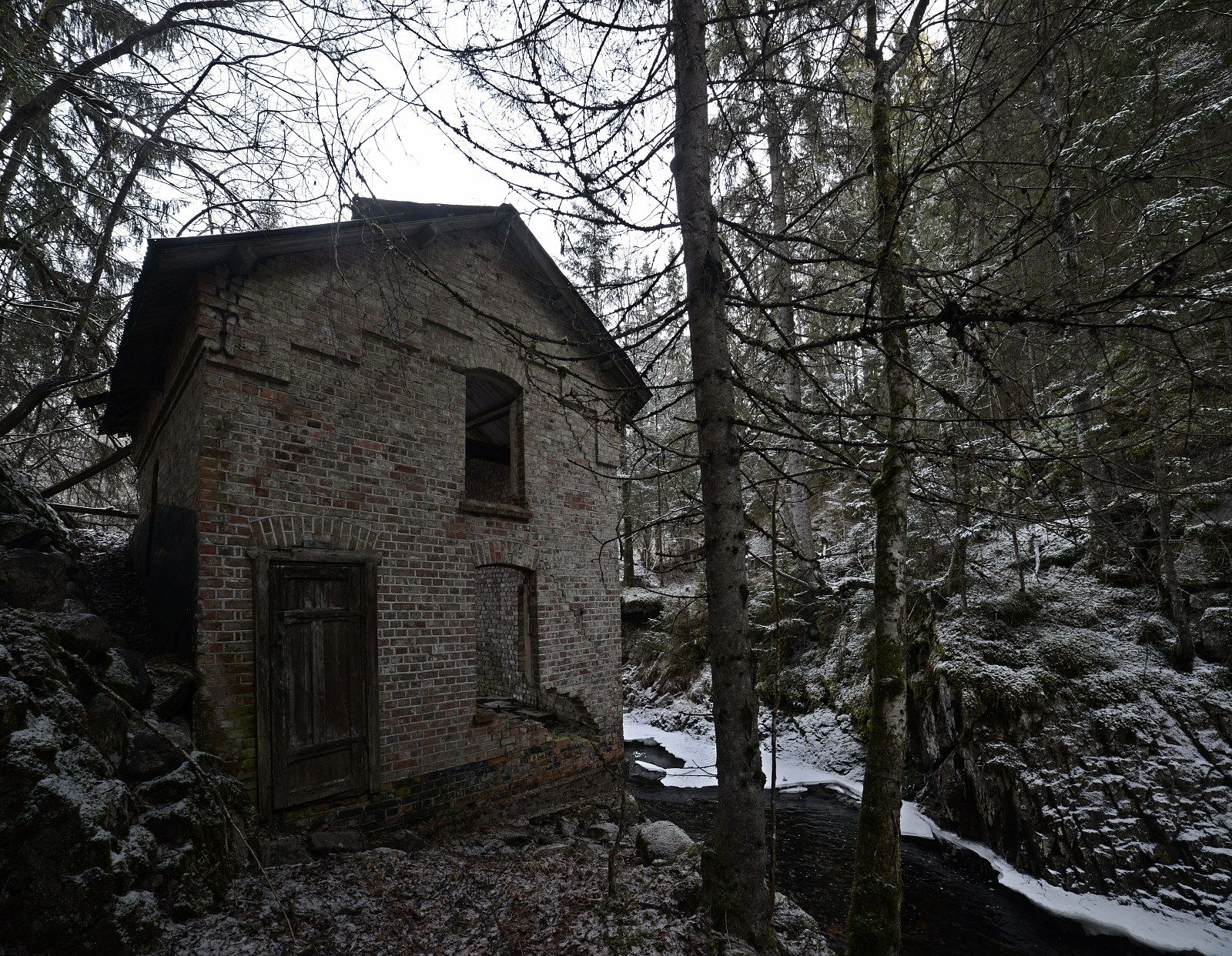
- Company type: Aksjeselskap
- Industry: Explosives
- Founded: 1882
- Defunct: 1978
- Fate: Acquired by Norsk Sprængstofindustri (1917); closed
- Headquarters: Nittedal, Norway
- Key people: Georg Frølich
- Products: Gunpowder, explosives

Nitedals Krudtværk (Norwegian for "Nitedal Gunpowder Works") was a factory in Nittedal that produced gunpowder. The factory was established in 1882 by Georg Frølich, with Peter Waage, Henrik Hvoslef, and Svend Foyn among the co-owners, and from 1894 Georg Frølich was sole owner. There were at that time five gunpowder works in Norway.

== History ==
The engineer Georg Frølich belonged to a family that had run several gunpowder works in the family business F.H. Frølich & Søn, including the Midtvandets and Liadalens gunpowder works. Wishing to operate on his own, free of the family ties in the business, he found a suitable site in Nittedal, an important condition being that it lie far from other settlement, since the fire and explosion risk in such activity was considerable. Frølich had accumulated capital running a wallpaper factory in Kristiania (Oslo); the business was established in 1883 and the factory came into operation in 1884.

The main product was various types of black powder, and from 1896 smokeless powder. A new explosive based on nitroglycerin, named Echo, was also developed at the works and became an important product for the Nittedal factory. Black powder from Nittedal was used especially in whaling. The gunpowder works consisted of about 100 buildings along the Ørfiskebekken stream, and a dedicated dam was built to supply water for generating electric power, named the Waage Dam (today written Vågedammen).

In 1917 the gunpowder works was bought by Norsk Sprængstofindustri (later Dyno Industrier) and Frølich stepped down. Production within the group was restructured, but the factory in Nittedal kept going until 1978 with smaller products such as cartridges for hunting ammunition, when it was closed as the last gunpowder works in Norway and the business ceased. At most the business had 50 employees, though normally there were fewer than 20 in Nittedal.

== After closure ==
The vegetation along the Ørfiskebekken slowly grew back, and from around 2010 some 600 dwellings were built nearby. The roads in the area have taken names from the gunpowder works, such as Georg Frølichs vei, Vågedamveien, Svartkruttveien, and Laboratorieveien.

== Bibliography ==
- Historien om Nitedals Krudtværk (2019). Nitedals Krudtværks venner, Nittedal.
