= Jonas Henry Støre =

Norwegian business executive (1888–1974)

- Born: Jonas Henry Paulsen Støre; 8 February 1888; Levanger Municipality, Norway
- Died: 15 November 1974 (aged 86)
- Education: University of Oslo
- Relatives: Jonas Gahr Støre (grandson)

Jonas Henry Paulsen Støre (8 February 1888 – 15 November 1974) was a Norwegian business executive. He was CEO and chairman of the explosives manufacturer Norsk Sprængstofindustri (now Dyno Nobel), a director of several of Norway's largest mining and power companies, and chairman of Norway's second largest bank Christiania Bank. He was the grandfather of Prime Minister Jonas Gahr Støre.

== Career ==
Støre was born in Levanger Municipality and moved to Christiania (now Oslo) as a young adult. He graduated from Christiania Commerce School in 1906 and studied economics for two years at the Royal Frederick University from 1906 to 1908, while simultaneously working at a bank, Centralbanken for Norge. He worked in executive positions for the Norsk Hydro industrial conglomerate from 1908, first at Notodden Salpeterfabrikk and as managing director of the electrochemical factory Sodium in Trondhjem from 1917 to 1919.

In 1919 he became office manager at Norsk Sprængstofindustri and from 1926 to 1953 he was the company's CEO. Norsk Sprængstofindustri produced dynamite, TNT and other explosives for mining, industrial and military applications, and was one of Norway's largest companies. According to historian Ingeborg Solbrekken, during the German occupation he was involved in collaborating with the German arms industry. After stepping down as CEO he was chairman of the board of the company from 1959 to 1961.

Støre was also a member of the board of directors of the Norwegian Employers' Confederation and the Federation of Norwegian Industries, and of numerous companies including mining companies Åmdals Verk and Sulitjelma Mines. He was also a member of the supervisory boards of mining company Sydvaranger, power company Hafslund, and aluminium manufacturer Norsk Aluminium Co. He was also a board member of various shipping companies. From 1946 he was chairman of the board of directors of Christiania Bank, Norway's second largest bank.

== Personal life ==
He was the son of Paul Edvart Støre, a wealthy farmer, Conservative Party mayor and deputy member of the Norwegian parliament from Levanger. He was the grandfather of the politician Jonas Gahr Støre.
