= Støre =

Støre is a Norwegian surname. It may refer to:

== People ==
- Heidi Støre (born 1963), a Norwegian footballer
- Jonas Gahr Støre (born 1960), Prime Minister of Norway since 2021
- Jonas Henry Støre (1888–1974), a Norwegian businessman
- Thor Støre (1924–2001), a Norwegian politician and chess journalist

== Politics ==
- Støre Cabinet, the government of Norway led by Jonas Gahr Støre since 2021
