= Black Powder Mill =

Heritage-listed house in Melbourne, Victoria, Australia

- Location of the former factory in Greater Metropolitan Melbourne
- Interactive map of the Black Powder Mill area

General information
- Status: Complete; closed
- Type: Former gunpowder mill
- Location: Parklea Avenue and Grassy Point Road, Cairnlea, City of Brimbank, Melbourne, Victoria, Australia
- Coordinates: 37°45′49″S 144°46′41″E
- Completed: 1942; 84 years ago
- Closed: c. 1988
- Owner: ICIANZ; City of Brimbank

Technical details
- Material: Concrete; timber; masonite; cellulose acetate; malthoid

Design and construction
- Engineer: ICIANZ engineers

Victorian Heritage Register
- Official name: Black Powder Mill
- Type: Registered place
- Designated: 12 June 2003
- Reference no.: H2029
- Heritage overlay no.: HO6
- Category: Manufacturing and Processing

The Black Powder Mill is a former powder mill used to grind gunpowder for bombs and shells, located at the junction of Parklea Avenue and Grassy Point Road, in Cairnlea, in the City of Brimbank, in the western suburbs of Melbourne, in Victoria, Australia.

Built in 1942, during World War II, on the traditional lands of the Wurundjeri people, the former mill was added to the Victorian Heritage Register on 12 June 2003 in recognition of its historical and scientific (technological) significance; and was also added to non-statutory lists by the City of Brimbank and to the Australian Engineering Heritage Register by Engineers Australia on 23 February 2017.

The former gunpowder mill was decommissioned from c. 1988.

== Description ==
The Black Powder Mill is a concrete- and timber-framed building housing a Chilean (or edge-runner) mill, formerly used to grind the components of gunpowder used principally in time delay fuses for bombs and shells. The building is the last remnant of the former Albion Explosives Factory, in Deer Park, which was set up initially in 1939 as an annex to the nearby Imperial Chemical Industries Australia and New Zealand (ICIANZ) explosives factory. The Australian Government, in preparing for World War II, had devised a system of co-operation with industry to increase production of strategic materiel. The annex was later taken over by the Commonwealth and used for the production of high explosives until its closure in the late 1980s and the transfer of its function to Mulwala in New South Wales.

The mill house consists primarily of a heavy concrete wall built in the shape of a broad V, which encloses the mill on two sides and provides a protecting screen to other parts of the factory. The other enclosing walls, being designed to afford pressure relief in the event of an explosion, are lightly constructed of masonite sheets on a timber frame, a section being glazed with cellulose acetate for lighting the mill house. The roof is of light construction, consisting of timber, covered externally with malthoid (or bitumastic felt). The floor is also covered with malthoid sheets, cemented into place.

The rest of the Albion Explosives Factory was decontaminated and demolished. However, the black powder mill survived, which – for safety reasons – was sited on the bank of the Kororoit Creek. The concrete blast walls were designed to direct any blast over the creek valley. The relatively light construction of both the roof and timber-framed south wall was designed to be sacrificial. The Chilean Mill with its large rollers, pan and gear box also survived, as did the shadow board for the specialised tools.

From 1988 a program of decommission and demolition of buildings began, and increased in c. 1998 when much of the site was cleared. By mid-2000, almost all the buildings had been demolished and a major program of decontamination was underway. The Black Powder Mill was the last building to remain standing of the former 700-odd which once comprised the Albion Explosives Factory.

From time-to-time, the former mill is open for viewing.

== See also ==
- List of manufacturing plants in Melbourne
- List of places on the Victorian Heritage Register in the City of Brimbank
