= Norsk Sprængstofindustri =

Norwegian explosives manufacturer

- Type: Aksjeselskap
- Industry: Explosives
- Founded: 1917
- Defunct: 1971
- Fate: Merged with Grubernes Sprængstoffabrikker to form Dyno Industrier
- Headquarters: Oslo, Norway
- Key people: Sam Eyde
- Products: Dynamite, explosives, gunpowder, fuses

Norsk Sprængstofindustri A/S (lit. 'Norwegian Explosives Industry') was a Norwegian explosives manufacturer and one of Norway's largest industrial companies. The company traced its roots to 1865 and was established through the merger of several companies in 1917. It produced dynamite, geomite, gunpowder, fuses, and other explosives used for mining, industrial, and military applications.

== History ==
Norsk Sprængstofindustri was founded in 1917 as a merger of Nitroglycerin Compagniet, A/S Haaøen Fabriker, Nordenfjeldske Sprængstof A/S, Nitedals Krudtværk, and Norsk Svovlsyrefabrik A/S, bringing together all Norwegian production of explosives and gunpowder, and was established on the initiative of Sam Eyde, director general of Norsk Hydro.

The oldest of the merged companies was Nitroglycerin Compagniet, established in 1865 with the participation of the dynamite inventor Alfred Nobel. That same year, Norway's first nitroglycerin factory was built at Fåbrofossen in the Lysakerelva river at Lilleaker, shortly after Nobel had established a similar factory in Sweden. In 1874 a serious explosion accident occurred, and two years later the business was moved to Engene by Sætre in Hurum. A/S Haaøen Fabriker was established in 1915, also on Sam Eyde's initiative, and had a factory on Håøya in the Oslofjord in the period 1916–1918.

The company produced civilian explosives such as dynamite, geomite, and fuses, but also supplied military explosives and gunpowder. In 1925, they would begin exporting explosives to China during the Warlord Era. Around 1950 it expanded into the chemical industry, including production in Lillestrøm, and in the 1960s the activity was further expanded into plastics and packaging production. Over the years the company had its head office at various addresses in Oslo, from 1961 at Tollbugata 22.

== Dyno Industrier and later ==
Through the merger of Norsk Sprængstofindustri and Grubernes Sprængstoffabriker, Dyno Industrier was established in 1971, combining all Norwegian explosives production in one company. Dyno developed into one of the world's largest producers of civil explosives, especially after acquiring the Swedish company Nitro Nobel in 1986, and in 2000 it was acquired by the Swedish investment company Industri Kapital and reorganized as Dyno Nobel.

The majority of the company's European operations were sold to Orica Mining Services in 2006, while its high-energy materials division was sold to the Chemring Group in 2007 and continued as the newly established Chemring Nobel.
