= James Cuming Jr. =

Australian industrial chemist and business leader (1861–1920)

James Cuming Jr. (1861–1920) was an Australian industrial chemist and business executive. The son of James Cuming (1835–1911), he managed and later chaired Cuming, Smith & Co. during its expansion into large-scale superphosphate production from imported rock, helped organise price-and-marketing compacts that stabilised the fertiliser trade in Victoria, and held senior roles in manufacturers’ and chemical industry bodies.

== Early life and education ==
James Cuming Jr. was born in 1861 at Portland, Maine, United States, the second son of James Cuming (1835–1911) and Elizabeth (née Smith). The family moved to Melbourne in 1862. He attended Melbourne Church of England Grammar School from 1876 to 1879, then in 1884 toured the United States, Europe and Great Britain to study industrial chemistry before joining the family firm as head chemist and later manager.

== Industrial leadership ==
In 1897 the Yarraville works of Cuming, Smith & Co. amalgamated with Felton, Grimwade & Co.’s acid and chemical works at Port Melbourne, with Cuming becoming general manager of the combined enterprise. He oversaw the transition from bone-based superphosphate to imported phosphate rock and expanded distribution across the Victorian wheat belt.

To end “ruinous competition”, he negotiated industry agreements with rivals including Wischer & Co. (1895), Federal Fertilisers (1904) and Mount Lyell (1905), arrangements formalised by formation of the Victorian Fertilizer Association in 1907. In the same year he established a wood-distillation works at Yarra Junction to produce chemicals previously imported.

Cuming also introduced employee welfare measures, including sickness and retirement benefits, in an attempt to preserve paternalist relations within a rapidly industrialising business.

== Professional and public roles ==
Cuming was a founding member of the Society of Chemical Industry of Victoria (established 1900) and served as its president in 1903 and 1914, promoting closer links between laboratory practice and factory production.

As president of the Victorian Chamber of Manufactures from 1917 to 1920 he became a prominent public advocate for local industry during wartime and the immediate post-war transition. His published addresses argued for protective tariffs and for employer-supported welfare schemes for workers; contemporary reports summarised his 1919 annual address under the headline “Manufacturers and the Tariff”. He also represented manufacturers in meetings with the Prime Minister in 1917 and issued statements on the industrial unrest of that year in his capacity as president.

He also served as president of the Victorian Chamber of Commerce, a role noted in the University of Melbourne’s regulation establishing the James Cuming Memorial Scholarships.

He served as president of the Old Melburnians in 1918–19 and supported the society’s wartime memorial hall and endowment appeal for former students who served.

Cuming also contributed to scientific education at the University of Melbourne, endowing the James Cuming Prize in 1910 for achievement in agricultural chemistry; the family firm later funded a lecture theatre and laboratory in his memory.

== Philanthropy and benefactions ==
In 1910 Cuming endowed the James Cuming Prize at the University of Melbourne with a gift of £1,000, to reward the top student each year in a subject relating to agricultural chemistry. During his presidency of the Old Melburnians (1918–19), the society publicly launched a memorial hall and endowment appeal for former students who served in the war. After his death, his company financed a lecture theatre and research laboratory in the University of Melbourne’s School of Chemistry as a memorial.

== Death and commemoration ==
Cuming died on 31 May 1920 at a private hospital in East Melbourne; his funeral the next day was widely attended by business and civic leaders. In his memory, members of the Victorian Chamber of Commerce endowed the James Cuming Memorial Scholarships at the University of Melbourne in 1930, funded at £2,028 11s 10d and awarded on Chemistry assessments; the School of Chemistry continues to offer the scholarships.

== Personal life ==
On 3 February 1885 he married Alice, daughter of W. M. Fehon. They had six children; the eldest son, William Fehon Cuming (1886–1933), succeeded him as general manager of Cuming, Smith & Co.

== See also ==
- Cuming, Smith & Co.
- Commonwealth Fertilisers and Chemicals
- Victorian Chamber of Manufactures (later became Australian Chamber of Manufactures and, after a 1998 merger, the Australian Industry Group)
- Victorian Chamber of Commerce
- James Cuming Sr.
- Yarraville
