= Fertiliser industry in Australia =

The fertiliser industry in Australia has been a central element of the nation's agricultural economy since the late nineteenth century. The introduction of superphosphate fertiliser in the 1870s enabled productive cropping on nutrient-poor soils, particularly in the wheat belts of Victoria, South Australia and Western Australia. Over time, the industry has expanded to include sulphuric acid production, phosphate rock processing, nitrogen-based fertilisers, and a range of industrial chemicals tied to mining and energy sectors.

== History ==
=== Origins (1870s–1900) ===
The first large-scale production of superphosphate in Australia began in 1875 at Yarraville, Melbourne, by Cuming, Smith & Co.. By the 1880s, fertiliser manufacture had spread to Adelaide, Port Melbourne and other centres, often using sulphuric acid combined with bone dust or guano before shifting to imported phosphate rock.

=== Expansion and joint ventures (1900–1960s) ===
Major producers included Cuming Smith, Felton Grimwade, Wallaroo–Mount Lyell, Cresco Fertilisers, and later Australian Fertilisers Ltd (Port Kembla) and ACF & Shirleys (Queensland). Joint ventures and mergers created large regional suppliers, underpinning expansion of wheat and pastoral industries. Phosphate was sourced increasingly from Nauru, Banaba (Ocean Island), and Christmas Island, linking the industry to Pacific resource extraction and colonial administration.

=== Corporate consolidation (1960s–present) ===
From the 1960s, international partners such as BP entered the sector through companies like Cuming Smith British Petroleum & Farmers Ltd in Western Australia. Subsequent mergers and acquisitions produced two dominant modern successors: Incitec Pivot and WesCEF, alongside specialist suppliers such as Ixom.

== Products ==
Key products have included:

- Superphosphate, the foundational fertiliser for grain-growing regions.
- Sulphuric acid, used in both fertiliser and industrial chemical manufacture.
- Nitrogen-based fertilisers (ammonia, ammonium nitrate, urea) from the mid-twentieth century.
- Potash and trace-element blends for specialised crops and pastures.

== Social and environmental issues ==
The industry has faced scrutiny over:

- Environmental impacts of acid works in urban areas such as Yarraville and Port Adelaide.
- Displacement of Banaban communities from Ocean Island due to phosphate mining.
- Ongoing debates about fertiliser use, soil health, and sustainability.

== Major companies (historic and current) ==
- Cuming, Smith & Co.
- Cresco Fertilisers
- Australian Fertilisers Ltd (Port Kembla)
- ACF & Shirleys Fertilisers Ltd
- CSBP
- Incitec Pivot
- Wesfarmers Chemicals, Energy & Fertilisers (WesCEF)
- Ixom

== See also ==
- Agriculture in Australia
- Banaba Island
- Mining in Australia
- Superphosphate
