= Incitec Pivot =

Australian company

Incitec Pivot Limited
- Type: Public
- Traded as: ASX: DNL
- Industry: Mining and Manufacturing
- Founded: Australia
- Headquarters: Southbank, Victoria, Australia
- Products: Explosives, Chemicals, Fertilisers
- Number of employees: 5,000 (2018)
- Subsidiaries: Dyno Nobel and Incitec Pivot Fertilizers
- Website: www.incitecpivot.com.au

Incitec Pivot Limited (ASX: DNL) is an Australian multinational corporation that manufactures fertiliser, explosives chemicals, and mining service. Incitec Pivot is the largest supplier of fertilisers in Australia; the largest supplier of explosives products and services in North America; and the second largest supplier of explosives products and services in the world. The company began trading on the Australian Securities Exchange on 30 July 2003 having been formed as the result of a merger between Incitec Fertilizers and Pivot, and substantially expanded with the acquisition of Southern Cross Fertilisers in 2006 and Dyno Nobel in 2008.

Incitec Pivot has approximately 5,000 employees and operates in the United States, Canada, Mexico, and Australia. In 2005, the company struck a deal with the Government of Nauru to re-develop the country's phosphate mining industry, which had fallen into disrepair. The company invested $5 million to facilities and machinery, and phosphate mining resumed in late 2006.

Incitec Pivot has based a large part of its fertilizer production on imports of phosphate rock from Western Sahara, a territory which has been occupied by Morocco since 1975. Since such imports are considered in violation of international law, Incitec Pivot has been blacklisted from portfolios of several ethical investors including the United Methodist Church, Danske Bank, Storebrand, KLP, and the national pension funds of Sweden and Luxembourg.

As of 31 May 2025 Incitec Pivot Limited has changed its name to Dyno Nobel Limited and its ticker code from IPL to DNL.

== History ==
Incitec Pivot Limited was formed in 2003 through the merger of Incitec Fertilisers and the Pivot group, originally established in 1919 as a Victorian farmers’ co-operative. The fertiliser operations were retained as a distinct subsidiary, Incitec Pivot Fertilisers, under the new corporate structure.

Several of the company’s present-day fertiliser sites have much earlier origins, tracing back to nineteenth-century producers such as Cuming Smith. Fertiliser works established at Yarraville (Melbourne) and Port Adelaide were later absorbed into Commonwealth Fertilisers and Chemicals (1929) and then into ICIANZ, before becoming part of Incitec following ICI’s divestment of Australian operations in the late twentieth century.

The merger created the country’s largest fertiliser supplier, which was subsequently expanded by the acquisition of Southern Cross Fertilisers in 2006 and explosives group Dyno Nobel in 2008.

== Incitec Pivot Fertilisers ==
Incitec Pivot Fertilisers (IPF) is a fertiliser manufacturing and distribution subsidiary of Incitec Pivot. IPF operates production facilities, import terminals and distribution networks across Australia, supplying a wide range of fertiliser products to grain, cotton, sugar, dairy and horticultural industries. The business incorporates assets and operations inherited from its predecessors, including the long-established distribution networks of Pivot in Victoria and the manufacturing base of Incitec in Queensland and New South Wales.

=== Operations ===
Incitec Pivot Fertilisers produces and markets fertilisers for broadacre and specialised agriculture. Its operations include:

- Phosphate Hill, Queensland – an integrated mine and fertiliser manufacturing complex producing ammonium phosphates.
- Gibson Island, Brisbane – formerly produced urea and ammonia (operations ceased in 2022).
- Distribution and blending facilities across Victoria, New South Wales, and Queensland.
- Import terminals for phosphate rock, potash, and other fertiliser inputs.

IPF also operates soil testing, agronomy services, and research partnerships to support fertiliser efficiency and sustainable use.

=== Products ===
Products marketed by Incitec Pivot Fertilisers include:

- Diammonium phosphate (DAP)
- Monoammonium phosphate (MAP)
- Urea
- Anhydrous ammonia
- Potash and trace element mixes for specialised crops

=== Controversies ===
Incitec Pivot Fertilisers, along with its parent company, has attracted scrutiny over the importation of phosphate rock from territories with disputed sovereignty, including Western Sahara. Several ethical investment funds have excluded the company on these grounds.
