= Grubernes Sprængstoffabrikker =

Former Norwegian explosives manufacturer

- Formerly: De norske Aerolitt- og Fænghættefabrikker
- Company type: Aksjeselskap
- Industry: Explosives
- Founded: 1917
- Defunct: 1984
- Fate: Merged into Dyno (1971); Ski factory closed
- Headquarters: Ski, Norway
- Products: Explosives, dynamite, plastics

Grubernes Sprængstoffabrikker (Norwegian for "The Miners' Explosives Factories") was a Norwegian producer of explosives, founded in 1917 with a factory in Ski. In 1971 the company merged with its competitor Norsk Sprængstofindustri and became part of Dyno. The factory in Ski was closed in 1984, when production was gathered at the Dyno factory at Gullaug in Lier.

== History ==
The factory was established on the Drømtorp farm in Ski in 1917 under the name De norske Aerolitt- og Fænghættefabrikker, soon changed to Grubernes Sprængstoffabrikker. Aerolitt was a Danish-developed explosive launched as an alternative to the Swedish Nobel products and their Norwegian producer, Norsk Sprængstofindustri. The two companies dominated the Norwegian explosives market until they merged in 1971.

=== Explosion accidents ===
Like many other dynamite factories, production at the Ski plant carried great risk. In 1969 a serious accident occurred when a packing house exploded and several people lost their lives. A further explosion occurred in 1971, while work was under way to phase out manual operations and establish a fully automatic kneading department, the part of the factory where the dangerous chemicals in the explosive were mixed.

=== Plastics production ===
By 1970 Grubernes had both the dynamite factory at Ski and plastics factories in Kongsvinger and Kristiansand. At Kongsvinger it produced plastic cans and bottles, while production in Kristiansand included food packaging and technical plastics. The same year, the company bought the British producer of spraying and disinfecting equipment, Cooper, Pegler & Co., and invested considerably in its production plants.

=== Wind-down ===
At the start of the 1970s, Grubernes was developing into a larger group, but its finances were strained. In a time of many industrial mergers, it merged in 1971 with its competitor Norsk Sprængstofindustri, which had roots back to 1865 and had been established with support from the Swedish Nobel. The new company was named Dyno, which developed into a central industrial company in Norway in the decades that followed. Production at the Ski factory continued under the name Dyno Ski until 1984, when the business was transferred to Dyno's plant at Gullaug in Lier and the Ski factory was closed.

The industrial site was later converted to other uses, including the Drømtorp upper secondary school, and today it is chiefly street names such as Anolitveien and Dynamitveien that recall the former explosives production in the area east of Ski.
