= Southern Cross Fertilisers =

Former Australian fertiliser company, acquired by Incitec Pivot in 2006

- Type: Public
- Industry: Fertilisers
- Founded: 1999
- Defunct: 2006 (acquired by Incitec Pivot)
- Fate: Acquired
- Successor: Incitec Pivot
- Headquarters: Mount Isa, Queensland, Australia
- Products: Ammonium phosphate, superphosphate, fertiliser blends

Southern Cross Fertilisers operated the integrated phosphate mine and ammonium phosphate (MAP/DAP) manufacturing complex at Phosphate Hill in north-west Queensland, Australia. The project was developed by WMC Fertilizers and commenced production in late 1999; following BHP Billiton’s 2005 acquisition of WMC Resources, the business was operated as Southern Cross Fertiliser Operations. It was sold to Incitec Pivot in May 2006. At the time it was described as Australia’s only maker of ammonium phosphate fertilisers.

== History ==
Southern Cross Fertilisers was established to operate Western Mining Corporation’s (WMC) integrated phosphate project in north-west Queensland. The operation comprised an open-cut phosphate rock mine and MAP/DAP fertiliser complex at Phosphate Hill, supplied with sulphuric acid from a large metallurgical acid plant commissioned by WMC at Mount Isa in September 1999. Ammonium phosphate production began at Phosphate Hill in late 1999.

During the early 2000s the Phosphate Hill complex was a major domestic source of ammonium phosphate. At the time of its sale to Incitec Pivot in May 2006 it was described as Australia’s only maker—and the largest manufacturer—of MAP/DAP fertilisers; the ACCC assessed the transaction in a market that included a distinct sub-market for ammonium phosphates.

== Acquisition by Incitec Pivot ==
On 9 May 2006, Incitec Pivot announced it had agreed to acquire Southern Cross Fertilisers from BHP Billiton for $165 million. The Australian Competition & Consumer Commission completed its informal review and did not oppose the transaction on 26 July 2006. Completion occurred on 1 August 2006.

The acquisition gave Incitec Pivot direct control of the vertically integrated Phosphate Hill operation—phosphate rock mining through to MAP/DAP manufacture—securing domestic supply and integrating manufacturing with its east-coast distribution network.

== Legacy ==
Following the acquisition, Southern Cross Fertilisers was integrated into Incitec Pivot’s fertiliser division. The Phosphate Hill mine and processing complex continues to operate within Incitec Pivot Fertilisers, producing MAP and DAP and supplying eastern Australian agriculture via Townsville logistics.
