= Incitec Fertilisers =

Former Australian fertiliser company

- Type: Public
- Industry: Chemicals, Fertilisers
- Founded: 1970 (as Consolidated Fertilizers Limited); 1983 (renamed Incitec); 1985 (merged into Incitec Limited); 2003 (as Incitec Fertilisers Limited)
- Defunct: 2003 (merged into Incitec Pivot)
- Fate: Merged with Pivot
- Successor: Incitec Pivot
- Headquarters: Brisbane, Queensland, Australia
- Products: Superphosphate, ammonium phosphate, urea, potash blends

Incitec Fertilisers was an Australian fertiliser manufacturer and distributor headquartered in Brisbane, Queensland. With roots in Queensland and New South Wales operations, it was one of the country's largest suppliers of fertiliser products prior to its 2003 merger with the Victorian co-operative Pivot, which created Incitec Pivot.

== History ==
Incitec Fertilisers emerged in the mid-20th century through the consolidation of Australian Co-operative Fertilizers (commenced in Toowoomba, Queensland in 1915), and Australian Fertilizers Ltd which had formed in 1920 in NSW and taken over the Single Superphosphate operations of the Elliot brothers (1862). By the late 20th century it was the dominant fertiliser manufacturer in eastern Australia, supplying bulk superphosphate, nitrogen, potash, and mixed fertilisers to the agricultural sector..

In July 2003, Incitec Fertilisers merged with Pivot to form Incitec Pivot, which was subsequently listed on the Australian Securities Exchange.

== Products ==
Incitec Fertilisers produced a wide range of fertiliser blends, including superphosphate, ammonium phosphate, urea, and potash mixes, marketed across Queensland, New South Wales, and northern Victoria.

== Operations ==
Incitec Fertilisers operated major manufacturing facilities in Queensland, including the Gibson Island plant in Brisbane (in Murarrie), which produced ammonia, urea, and other nitrogen fertilisers. It also had distribution networks across Queensland, New South Wales, and northern Victoria. It served broadacre and horticultural farmers.

In November 1987, Incitec Ltd announced a A$27 million expansion of its ammonium nitrate manufacturing capacity. As a subsidiary of AFL Holdings Ltd (controlled by ICI Australia Ltd at the time), the company planned to build a second nitric acid plant (scheduled to come on stream by the end of 1988) and a new ammonium nitrate granulation plant at its Newcastle nitrogen complex in New South Wales.

In 1995-1996 Incitec Fertilisers expanded its distribution in South Australia through a partnership with Dairy Vale Rural Supplies and Mount Compass Fertilizers. The three organisations opened a joint depot at Mount Compass on the Fleurieu Peninsula. This gave farmers in the region their first access to Incitec’s full product range, including traditional fertilisers such as single superphosphate, double super, super potash blends and urea, as well as Incitec-exclusive products. The company also offered tailored soil, plant and water analysis services adapted to local soil types and climatic conditions.

== Legacy ==
The company's assets, brands, and operations continue under Incitec Pivot Fertilisers, a division of Incitec Pivot Limited.
