= Ixom =

Australian chemicals and water treatment company

IXOM
- Type: Private
- Industry: Chemicals; water treatment
- Founded: 2015
- Headquarters: Melbourne, Victoria, Australia
- Area served: Australia, New Zealand, Asia
- Products: Industrial chemicals, water treatment solutions, food and dairy chemicals, mining reagents
- Parent: Keppel Infrastructure Trust (2019–present)
- Website: www.ixom.com

IXOM is a chemical and ingredient manufacturer and distributor in Australia and New Zealand. IXOM is headquartered in Melbourne, Victoria, operating across 10 companies globally with over 1300 employees.

IXOM provides services including water treatment and chemical sourcing, manufacturing, distribution, storage, and use.

Their products, services and solutions are used across many end markets, including dairy, agriculture, viticulture, electricity, steel, food and beverage, pulp and paper, mining and construction, and water treatment, across Australia, New Zealand, and Asia.

== History ==
IXOM originated as the chemicals division of Orica Limited, one of Australia's largest multinational chemical companies. In 2015, Orica divested its chemicals business to the Blackstone Group, which established the division as a standalone company under the name IXOM.

The chemical operations that later became IXOM can trace their origins to the 19th century, including the acid and fertiliser manufacturer Cuming, Smith & Co., which through mergers became part of Imperial Chemical Industries Australia and New Zealand (ICIANZ) and subsequently Orica.

In 2019, Blackstone sold IXOM to Keppel Infrastructure Trust, part of Singapore's Keppel Ltd., in a deal valued at approximately A$1.1 billion.

== Operations ==
IXOM has a global reach, importing from 250 ports and 70 countries, with over 30 manufacturing facilities and 50 terminal positions. Its portfolio includes:

- Water treatment chemicals for municipal and industrial use, as one of the largest manufacturers of chlorine across Australia and New Zealand.
- Food and dairy industry chemicals, covering both food ingredients, flavours and active ingredients as well as process cleaning solutions for food and beverage manufacturers
- Agriculture and farming solutions for crop production, fertilizer and animal health
- Health and personal care ingredients, with access to premium botanicals, essential oils and fragrances through its Life Sciences division and ABP brand
- Building and infrastructure chemicals and construction materials, including plasterboard, insulation, surface coatings, and more, where high quality and performance are essential
- AdBlue and other diesel exhaust fluid products
- Mining reagents, including sodium cyanide and other process chemicals.
- General industrial chemical supply.

== See also ==
- Orica
- Fertiliser industry in Australia
