= James Cuming (chemist, born 1835) =

Scottish-born Australian chemist, industrialist and civic leader (1835–1911)

James Cuming (1835–1911) was a Scottish-born farrier, chemist, industrialist and civic leader in colonial Victoria. He co-founded the Yarraville-based chemical and fertiliser firm later known as Cuming, Smith & Co., which became a major producer of sulphuric acid and superphosphate for Victorian agriculture. He served two terms as mayor of Footscray, and was president of the Footscray Football Club from 1895 until his death in 1911.

== Early life ==
Cuming was born in Scotland in 1835 and trained as a farrier and chemist. He emigrated to Victoria in 1862 after a period in North America.

== Industrial career ==
In the early 1870s Cuming, together with George Smith and Charles Campbell, acquired an acid plant at Yarraville. The enterprise grew into Cuming, Smith & Co., producing sulphuric acid and superphosphate on a large scale and becoming a substantial local employer.

By the mid-1890s the works were one of the largest heavy-chemical operations in Melbourne’s west. The firm later absorbed or partnered with other producers and eventually became part of larger fertiliser combinations in the 20th century.

== Civic roles and philanthropy ==
Cuming served on the Footscray Borough Council and was mayor in 1885–86 and again in 1890–91. To mark Footscray’s proclamation as a city in 1891, he donated a commemorative granite drinking fountain and horse trough outside the town hall in Hyde Street.

Cuming also funded community facilities in Yarraville. The Cuming Institute building opened in 1910 as the new home of the Yarraville Citizens’ Club.

== Football administration ==
Cuming was president of the Footscray Football Club from 1895 until 1911, the club’s longest-serving president, overseeing four VFA premierships in 1898, 1899, 1900 and 1908. (Note: For contemporary confirmation of his presidency during this period, see for example: "Footscray Football Club – Annual Meeting". Independent (Footscray). 21 March 1896..)

== Death and commemoration ==
Cuming died on 18 October 1911. A marble memorial by sculptor Margaret Baskerville was erected by public subscription. Originally unveiled near Napier Street in Footscray, it was later relocated to Yarraville Gardens and was restored and rededicated on 21 October 2001. The memorial features a bust of Cuming above four putti symbolising Peace, Harmony, Plenty and Industry.

== Legacy ==
Cuming’s leadership helped anchor heavy industry at Yarraville and supported civic institutions in Footscray and Yarraville. His presidency at Footscray coincided with one of the club’s most successful eras.

== See also ==
- Alfred Felton
- Charles Gordon Campbell
- Cuming, Smith & Co.
- Frederick Sheppard Grimwade
- James Cuming Jr.
- Western Bulldogs
- Yarraville
