= Dyno Industrier =

Former Norwegian explosives and chemicals group

- Formerly: Dyno ASA (from 1999)
- Type: Aksjeselskap
- Industry: Explosives, chemicals, plastics
- Founded: 1971
- Defunct: 2000
- Fate: Acquired and split into Dyno Nobel and Dynea
- Headquarters: Oslo, Norway
- Key people: Ragnar Halvorsen
- Products: Explosives, adhesives, plastics

Dyno Industrier (from 1999 Dyno ASA) was a former Norwegian industrial group that was one of the world's largest producers of civil explosives, and also engaged in other chemical activity, particularly the production of adhesives, as well as plastics. In the late 1990s, Dyno had a turnover of around 12 billion kroner, with activities in some 40 countries and about 9,000 employees.

Dyno Industrier was formed in 1971 through the merger of two companies, Norsk Sprængstofindustri and Grubernes Sprængstoffabriker, both founded in 1917; the former traced its roots to the Nitroglycerin Compagniet, established on Lysaker in 1865 on the initiative of Alfred Nobel. Norsk Hydro was for a long time the group's largest owner, until in 2000 it was bought by the Swedish investment company Industri Kapital, which split up Dyno's businesses, creating Dyno Nobel to carry on the explosives operation while the chemicals business was integrated with the Finnish Nordkemi to form part of the company Dynea from 2001.

== Gallery ==
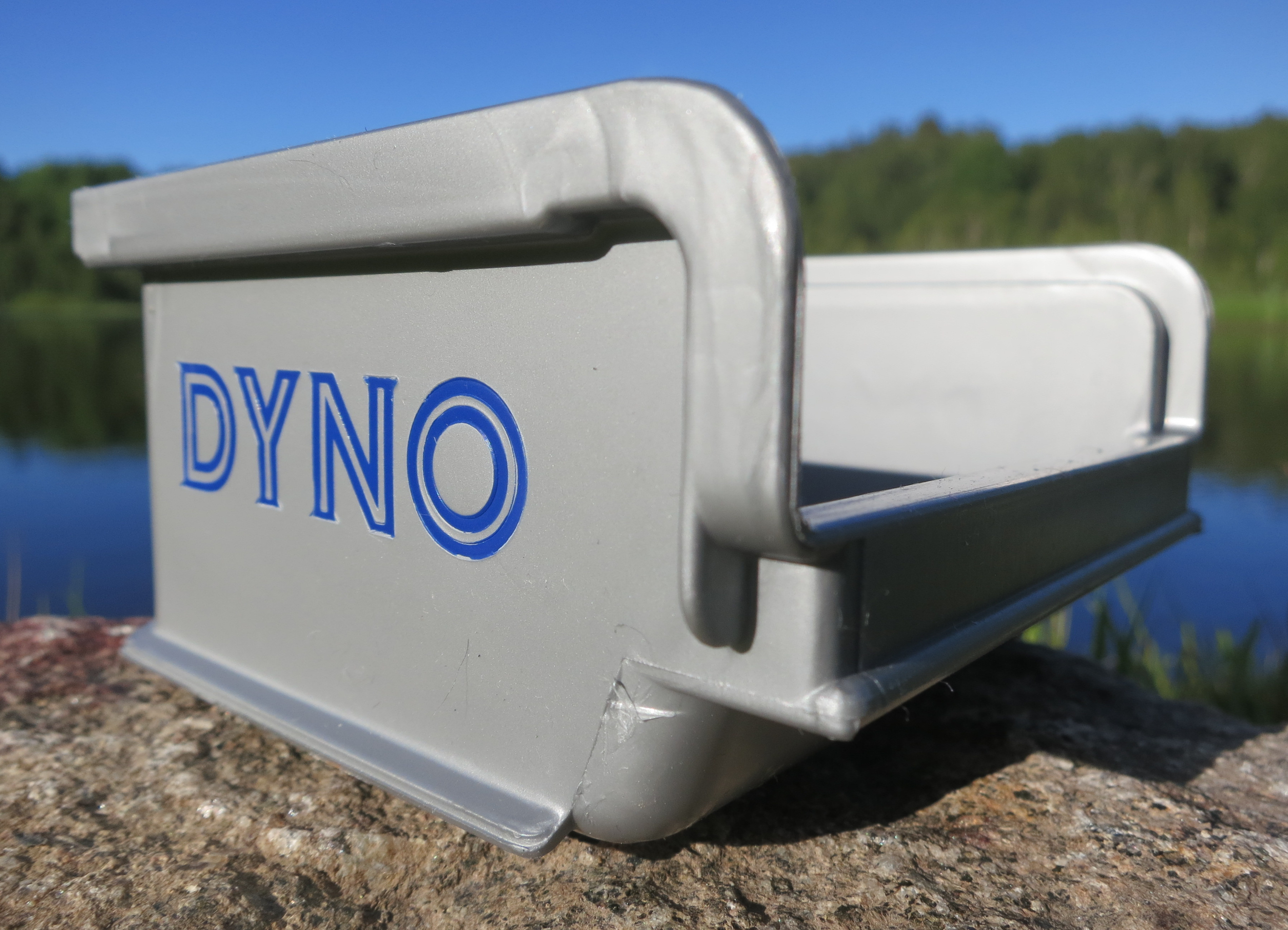
1990s stackable plastic storage bin by Dynoplast, subsidiary of Dyno Industrier
