= Charles Gordon Campbell =

Charles Gordon Campbell was born on the 14 January 1840, in Aberdeen Scotland. He was the son of Duncan Campbell, cattle driver and his wife Catherine née Mclean. Campbell was a Colonial Australian merchant and pastoralist. Along with Frederick Sheppard Grimwade, Alfred Felton, and James Cuming, he established one of Australia's largest fertiliser companies. All four men are quoted as being some of early Australia's greatest Industrialists.

He was a co-founder of the Port Melbourne Sugar Company.

He died 13 September 1905 in Sydney.

== Sources ==
- Grimwade, Frederick Sheppard - Bright Sparcs Biographical entry at www.asap.unimelb.edu.au
- Entry for Charles Campbell (1840-1905), www.adb.com.au
- Wakool Shire Community Heritage Study 2006–2007, Wakool Shire Council, and Heritage Office, NSW Department of Planning, pp. 26–29.
