= Alfred Felton =

Australian entrepreneur, art collector and philanthropist

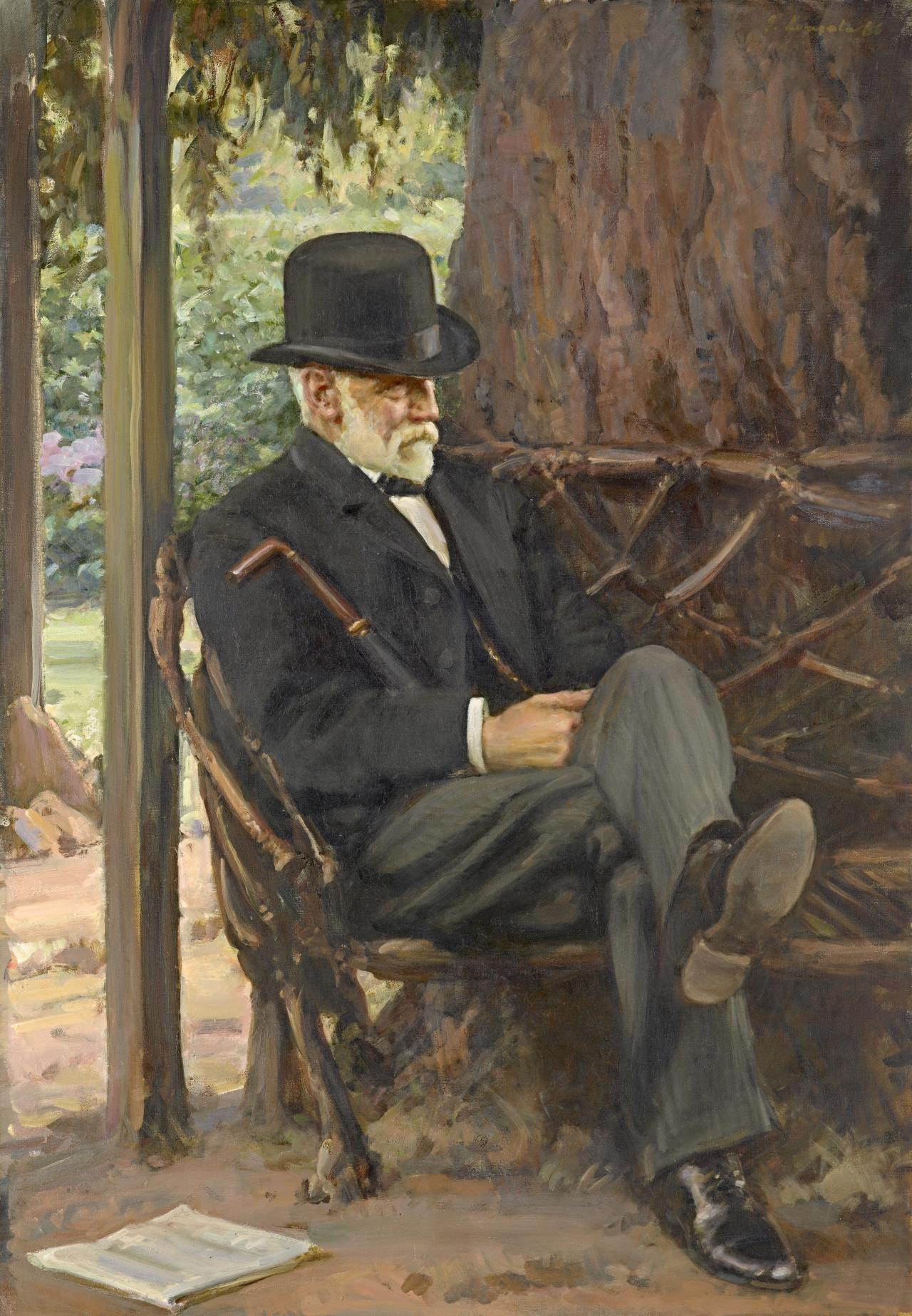
Portrait of Alfred Felton by John Longstaff at the National Gallery of Victoria

Alfred Felton (8 November 1831 – 8 January 1904) was an Australian entrepreneur, art collector and philanthropist.

== Biography ==
Alfred Felton was born at Maldon, Essex, England, the fifth child of six sons and three daughters of William Felton, a currier, and his wife Hannah. Felton travelled to Victoria on the ship California in 1853 intending to search for gold.

Felton also purchased two large estates, Murray Downs and Langi Kal Kal in partnership with merchant and pastoralist Charles Gordon Campbell, a founding partner in Cuming Smith & Company. Upon Felton's death, his share in the Estates were sold to Campbell.

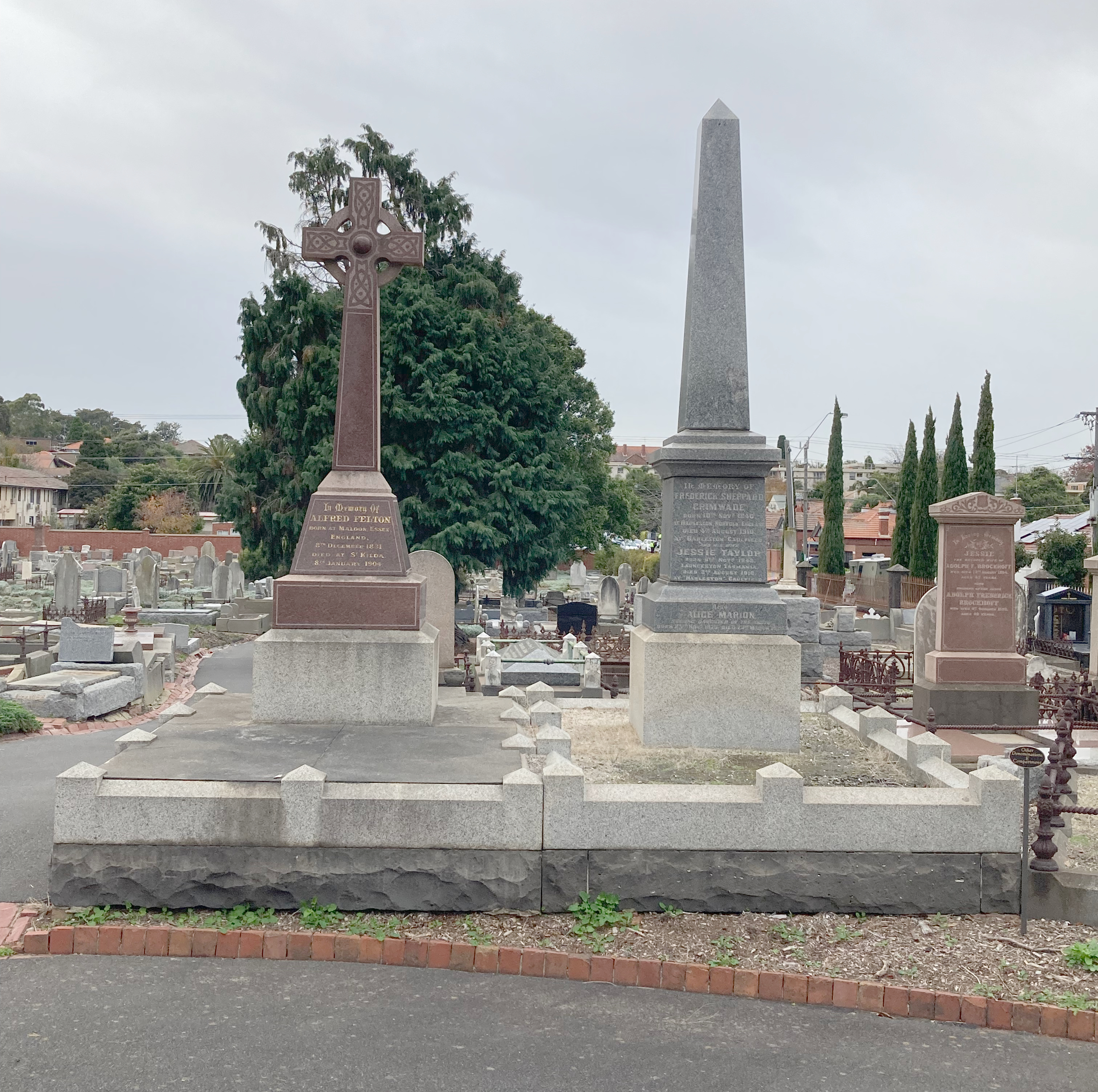
Graves of Alfred Felton (left) and Frederick Grimwade (right) at St Kilda Cemetery

Felton died on 8 January 1904 and was buried at St Kilda Cemetery.

In 2005, Melbourne Grammar Grimwade House opened "The Alfred Felton Hall" in honour of Felton.

== Felton Bequest ==
Alfred Felton had no direct descendants. In his will, he established a philanthropic trust, known as the Felton Bequest. A$35 million at 2000 values. The Gallery selected a number of works from Felton's personal collection for retention by it, and the remainder was sold at auction, the proceeds being added to the Bequest.

Over its life, the Felton Bequest has contributed funds to many charitable purposes and projects in Victoria and has acquired numerous works of art which it has donated to the National Gallery of Victoria. The acquisition funds available to the Gallery, through the Bequest, exceed those of London's National and Tate galleries combined.

Soon after the establishment of the Felton Bequest, the October Revolution occurred in Russia. The Bolshevik government that came to power there sold a part of the collections of such museums as the Hermitage, Pushkin Museum, part of which was acquired by the Felton Bequest for the National Gallery of Victoria. The Felton Bequest has also been used to buy many masterpieces of Australian art. Since the bequest was created, more than 15,000 art works have been acquired through the Felton Bequest, the current total value of which has been estimated at more than A$2 billion. These works are the core of today's National Gallery of Victoria collection, and have made the Gallery's collections celebrated around the world.
