= Adelaide Chemical Works =

Former South Australian chemical and fertiliser manufacturer

- Company type: Private
- Industry: Chemical
- Founded: 22 July 1882
- Founder: Robert Burns Cuming
- Headquarters: Torrensville
- Area served: South Australia
- Products: Sulphuric acid Superphosphate

The Adelaide Chemical Works was a chemical and fertiliser manufacturer in Adelaide, Australia. Established on a 5½-acre site at New Thebarton on 22 July 1882 by industrialist Robert Burns Cuming, the works manufactured sulphuric acid and, from mid-1884, superphosphate for South Australian agriculture; a second works was erected at Port Adelaide in 1900 to handle bulk rock-phosphate cargoes that began arriving in 1901.

== History ==
Robert Burns Cuming selected a rectangular 5½-acre site at New Thebarton on the River Torrens floodplain, and operations began on 22 July 1882 as South Australia’s first chemical works.

Early output centred on sulphuric acid; by mid-1884 the works was producing “bone super” and then rock-phosphate superphosphate.

Flooding in 1889 prompted a substantial rebuild, culminating in a new brick works whose foundation stone was laid by Mrs RB Cuming on 7 November 1896.

To handle port logistics and rising demand, a second works was erected at Ocean Steamers’ Wharf, Port Adelaide, from early 1900; company offices opened in Currie Street the same year.

The first bulk cargo of Ocean Island rock phosphate for the plant—about 3,350 tons—arrived in November 1901, enabling large-scale manufacture for the State’s wheat and pastoral districts.

In 1902 the enterprise was registered as the Adelaide Chemical and Fertiliser Company Limited with £50,000 paid-up capital; by 1917 combined output from Torrensville and Port Adelaide was reported at roughly 45,000 tons a year.

Operations were later rationalised through sector mergers, with the company’s records preserved in the Adelaide & Wallaroo Fertilisers (later Wallaroo–Mount Lyell Fertilisers) archive at the State Library of South Australia.
