= Cuming, Smith & Co. =

Australian chemical and fertiliser manufacturer founded in 1872

- Industry: Chemicals; fertilisers
- Founded: 1872
- Founder: James Cuming; George Smith; Charles Campbell
- Successors: Cuming Smith Mount Lyell (CSML); Cuming Smith British Petroleum (CSBP); Wesfarmers Chemicals, Energy & Fertilisers (WesCEF)
- Headquarters: Yarraville, Melbourne, Colony of Victoria
- Area served: Australia; New Zealand
- Products: Sulphuric acid; superphosphate; other industrial chemicals

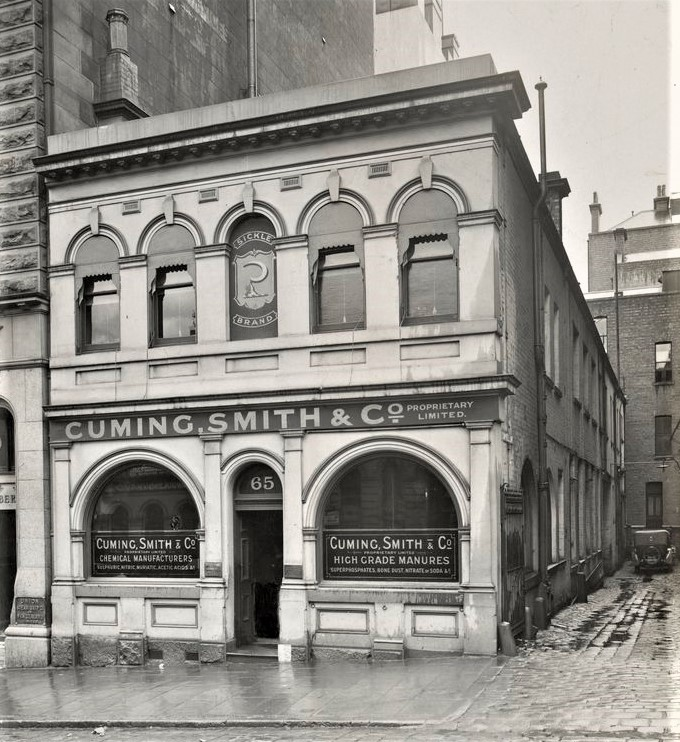
Cuming, Smith & Co. Proprietary Limited Headquarters c.1890-1897

Cuming, Smith & Co. was an Australian chemical and fertiliser manufacturer established in 1872 in Yarraville, Melbourne. The firm began as a sulphuric acid producer and later became a significant manufacturer of superphosphate used in Australian agriculture. Its operations and interests extended across Victoria, South Australia, Western Australia and other jurisdictions, with associated activities in New South Wales, Queensland and New Zealand.

Through mergers and joint ventures, the business formed part of Cuming Smith Mount Lyell (CSML) in Western Australia in 1927 and later became CSBP after British Petroleum acquired an equity stake in 1964. In 1979, Wesfarmers launched a takeover bid for CSBP valued at approximately A$60 million, at the time the largest corporate acquisition in Australia. By 1986, Wesfarmers had purchased BP's remaining stake and assumed full ownership. The successor operations now form part of Wesfarmers Chemicals, Energy & Fertilisers (WesCEF).

== History ==
=== Origins ===
The company originated in 1872 when Scottish-born farrier and chemist James Cuming (1835–1911), together with his brother-in-law George Smith and merchant Charles Campbell, acquired a small sulphuric acid works at Yarraville, then an emerging industrial district on Melbourne's western fringe. The location offered river access via the Saltwater (now Maribyrnong) River, proximity to other noxious trades, and relatively low land costs. Cuming Smith built this site into one of the first medium-scale mineral-acid complexes in Victoria, producing sulphuric acid and superphosphate from around 1872.

Early production used the lead-chamber process typical of the period, supplying acid to industries including sugar refining, leather tanning and candle making during a phase of rapid population and manufacturing growth in Victoria. By 1881, Smith had left the partnership, and Cuming and Campbell continued to manage the enterprise.

=== Fertiliser operations ===
In 1875 the firm began producing fertilisers, responding to nutrient-poor soils and expanding agricultural settlement in south-eastern Australia. Initial superphosphate output used bone dust as feedstock, later supplemented by imported guano and, increasingly, phosphate rock sourced from Pacific islands such as Nauru (Ocean Island/Banaba). The shift to rock phosphate reduced costs and supported higher volumes, contributing to wider adoption by grain producers.

Demand for superphosphate rose through the late nineteenth century, particularly among wheat and oats growers in Victoria and South Australia. The Yarraville site expanded capacity during this period and developed distribution links to regional markets.

=== Expansion and alliances ===
From the 1880s the company extended production and distribution beyond Victoria. In 1882 Robert Burns Cuming established the Adelaide Chemical Works on a 5.5-acre site at New Thebarton (later Torrensville), initially focused on sulphuric acid and then superphosphate by 1884. Following flood damage in 1889, new plant was constructed in brick in 1896. A second facility at Port Adelaide opened in 1900, aided by bulk phosphate shipments beginning in 1901. In 1904 the enterprise was registered as the Adelaide Chemical and Fertilizer Company Ltd. Output reportedly reached about 45,000 tons of fertiliser per year by 1917.

By 1888 in Victoria, the firm was promoting a large variety of chemical manures (including bone dust and superphosphates), to Victorian growers.

In 1897, Cuming, Smith & Co. merged with Felton, Grimwade & Co. (a significant chemical and pharmaceutical concern with assets in Port Melbourne), providing additional capital, distribution, and access to markets including New Zealand. James Cuming Jr. becoming general manager of the combined operations.

=== Western Australia and associated operations ===
Beyond Victoria and South Australia, the firm and its associates developed operations that served regional needs. Activities included the Britannia Creek wood-distillation works (c.1907–1924) and fertiliser manufacture at Bassendean in Western Australia (from 1909 under the "Florida" brand). A separate Western Australian venture began in 1910 to supply the expanding wheat belt.

Intensifying competition from rivals such as Wallaroo–Mount Lyell and Cresco Fertilisers led to market-sharing arrangements agreed in 1917. Production at Torrensville ceased in 1933, with South Australian focus consolidating at Port Adelaide; the Adelaide operations later participated in mergers forming Adelaide and Wallaroo Fertilisers Ltd in 1965.

=== Yarra Valley Timber operations ===
In 1909 Cuming, Smith & Co. established a large wood distillation plant at Britannia Creek near Yarra Junction, Victoria. The plant was designed to process hardwood timber into charcoal, methanol (then commonly known as wood alcohol), acetate of lime, and other by-products used in the chemical and explosives industries.

At its peak, the facility was among the largest of its kind in Australia, drawing on extensive supplies of mountain ash and other eucalypt timber from the surrounding Upper Yarra forests. The distillation works operated in conjunction with tramways that transported cut timber from local sawmills to the plant, creating a tightly integrated timber-to-chemicals supply chain.

The Britannia Creek works gave Cuming, Smith & Co. an important foothold in the timber-derived chemicals sector, complementing its existing fertiliser and sulphuric acid businesses. Although operations eventually declined during the 1920s and early 1930s, substantial remnants of the plant survive and the site is recognised for its industrial heritage significance.

in 1918, the company acquired the Mississippi Sawmilling Company, taking over its mill and settlement at the junction of Mississippi and Marble Creeks. The Mississippi mill operated from about 1905 until the early 1930s, with heritage records noting occupation between 1905 and 1933. Contemporary tramway chronologies also list the Mississippi Sawmilling Company as active until around 1930, distinct from the nearby Enterprise Sawmilling Company, to 1931.

Cuming, Smith & Co. also purchased the Enterprise Mill at Warburton in 1925 following the liquidation of the Enterprise Sawmilling Company. The mill continued under Cuming Smith ownership until 1932, when its plant and equipment were sold at public auction. These ventures formed part of a broader portfolio of regional timber interests, which included associated tramways and seasoning works, and Britannia Creek Wood Distillation Plant, but were wound down by the early 1930s.

=== CSML in Western Australia ===
In 1927 Cuming, Smith & Co. partnered with the Mount Lyell Mining & Railway Company and Westralian Farmers Ltd. to form Cuming Smith Mount Lyell Fertilisers Ltd. (CSML). The joint venture concentrated on meeting Western Australia's agricultural demand for fertilisers, particularly superphosphate, which was increasingly required as wheat production expanded in the state's wheat belt.

Over the following two decades CSML produced close to two million tonnes of superphosphate, supplying a rapidly growing rural sector. Wheat cultivation in Western Australia grew from approximately 285,000 acres in 1908–09 to more than 3.5 million acres by 1933, much of it supported by the availability of superphosphate.

=== Australian Fertilisers Ltd ===
In 1928 Cuming, Smith & Co., together with Mount Lyell Mining & Railway Company and Nobel (Australia) Ltd, acquired interests in Australian Fertilisers Ltd. (est. 1921). The acquisition included a facility at Port Kembla, New South Wales, designed to provide large-scale fertiliser production to eastern Australian markets.

Although the plant closed temporarily during the Great Depression, it reopened the same year and underwent significant upgrades during the 1930s and following the Second World War. By the 1950s and 1960s, annual production was reported at around 90,000 tons of fertiliser. The Port Kembla facility later formed part of the operations of ICIANZ, with successor entities including Incitec Pivot and Ixom continuing activities in the region.

=== ACF & Shirleys Fertilisers Ltd ===
In 1928, Australian Co-operative Fertilizers Ltd (founded 1915) merged with Shirleys Fertilizers Ltd to form A.C.F. & Shirleys Fertilisers Ltd, one of Queensland's principal fertiliser suppliers. As part of its broader east-coast strategy, Cuming, Smith & Co. acquired a significant shareholding and entered into partnership with the new company, giving it influence over fertiliser distribution in Queensland alongside its interests in Australian Fertilisers Ltd at Port Kembla.

ACF & Shirleys operated key facilities at Runcorn (redeveloped in 1932 with capacity for 3,000 tonnes of storage and 200–300 tonnes weekly output) and Pinkenba, supplying fertiliser to Queensland's sugar, fruit and grain industries. Through its involvement, Cuming, Smith & Co. extended its influence beyond Victoria, South Australia, New South Wales, and Western Australia, securing a position in all major agricultural markets of the eastern seaboard.

=== Commonwealth Fertilizers and Chemicals Pty Ltd ===
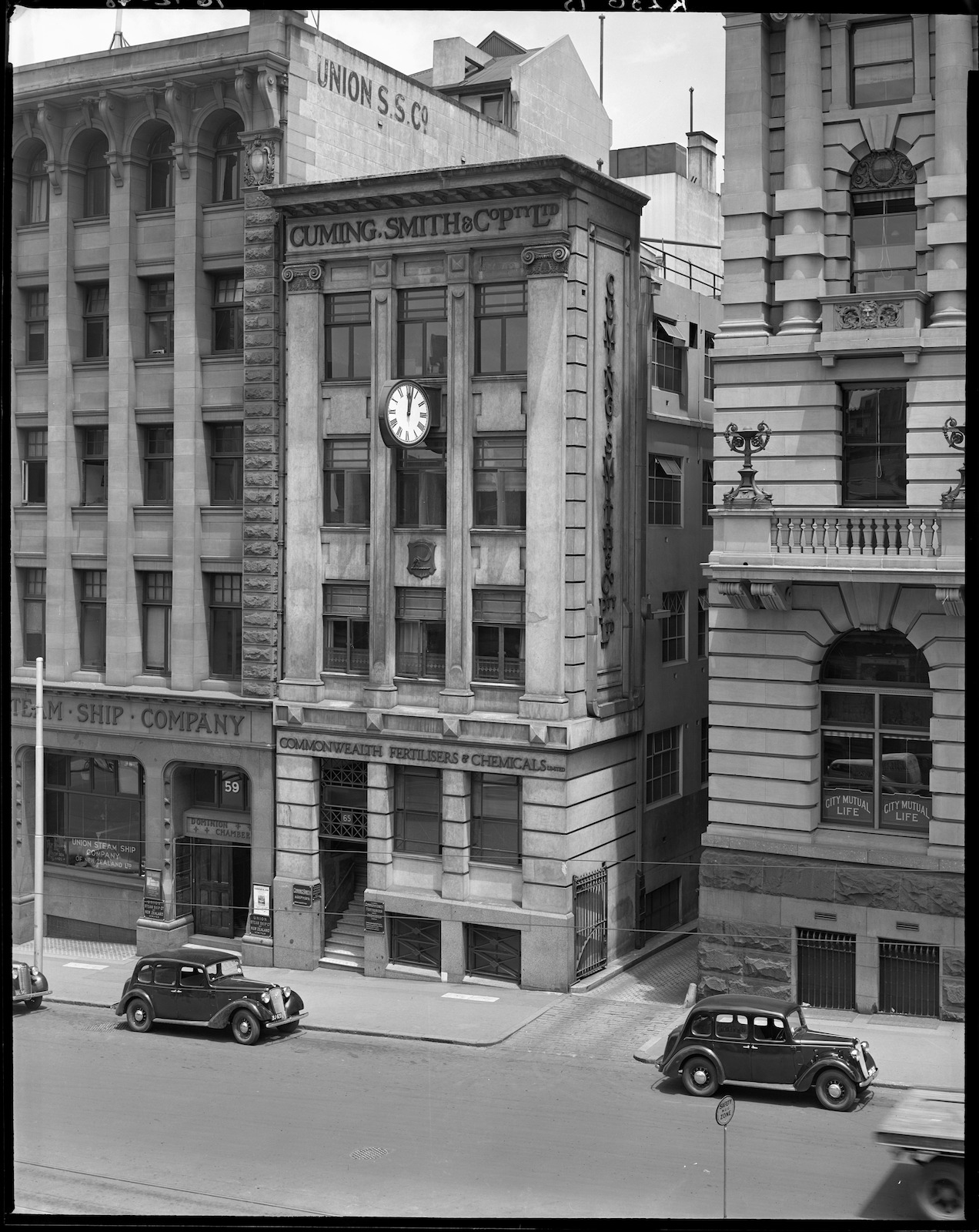
Commonwealth Fertilizers and Chemicals Proprietary Limited Headquarters, 16 Dec 1948

In 1929 Cuming, Smith & Co. amalgamated with Wischers Pty Ltd, Mount Lyell Mining and Railway Company Ltd, and Nobel (Australia) Pty Ltd to establish Commonwealth Fertilizers and Chemicals Pty Ltd, based in Yarraville, Victoria.
Other reports of the day name Federal Fertilisers Ltd in place of Nobel, reflecting contemporary uncertainty over the precise corporate structure of Nobel’s fertiliser interests.
Cuming, Smith & Co. held a controlling shareholding, and its managing director William Fehon (W.F.) Cuming continued in leadership, while production consolidated at Yarraville and older sites (including the Port Melbourne plant) were closed. This consolidation improved competitive positioning against rival fertiliser providers such as Pivot Farmers' Co-operative.

=== Imperial Chemical Industries Australia and New Zealand (ICIANZ) ===
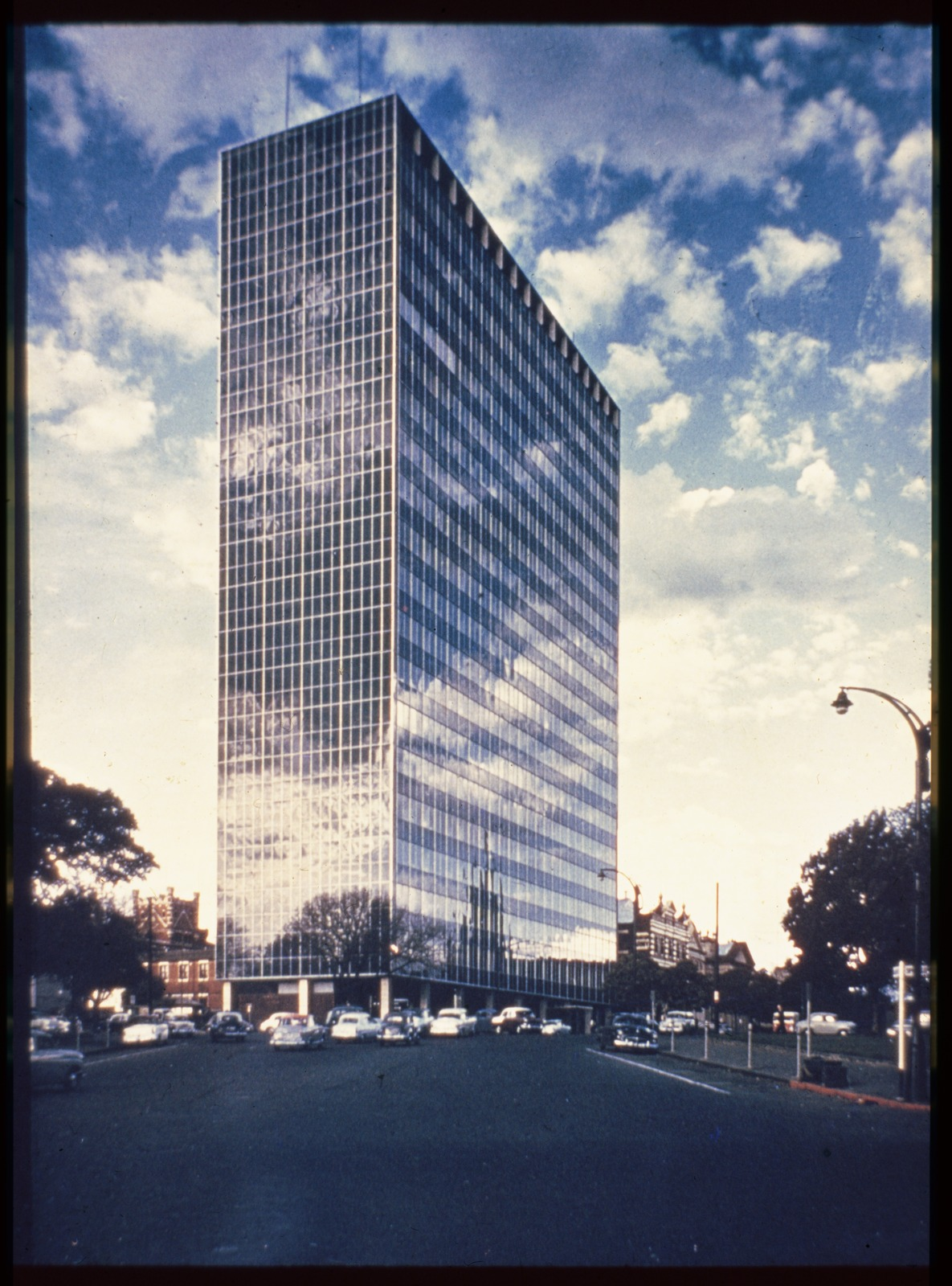
Imperial Chemical Industries Australia and New Zealand Headquarters, c.1960s

In 1961, Commonwealth Fertilizers and Chemicals (CF&C), along with some Cuming, Smith & Co. interests were rolled into ICIANZ under the directorship of Mariannus Adrian ("Mac") Cuming, a long-time executive of Cuming Smith and CF&C. Mac served as a director of ICIANZ, and maintained continuity between the pre-acquisition fertiliser businesses and ICI’s Australasian company.
During this period, ICIANZ's headquarters was the tallest building in Melbourne.
At 22 stories, ICI House was the first building to break Melbourne's long standing 11 to 12 story tall height limit, and was the first international style skyscraper in Australia.

=== BP and Cresco acquisition ===
In 1964 British Petroleum (BP) took an equity stake in Cuming Smith Mount Lyell, and the business became known as Cuming Smith British Petroleum (CSBP). BP's investment enabled the construction of new plants at Kwinana, Western Australia, which commenced operation in 1967. These facilities significantly expanded sulphuric acid and fertiliser production capacity.

In 1970 CSBP acquired rival Cresco Fertilisers, consolidating a large share of the Western Australian fertiliser market. Rationalisation of operations led to the closure of older sites, including the Bassendean works in 1971.

=== Wesfarmers control ===
In 1979 Wesfarmers, then operating as Westralian Farmers, launched a successful takeover bid for CSBP valued at approximately A$60 million, described at the time as the largest corporate acquisition in Australian history. By 1986 Wesfarmers had purchased BP's remaining stake and assumed full ownership.

Under Wesfarmers, CSBP became the foundation of a diversified chemicals and fertiliser division, supplying both agriculture and mining industries. As part of Wesfarmers Chemicals, Energy & Fertilisers (WesCEF), CSBP continues to operate major production facilities at Kwinana, manufacturing superphosphate as well as industrial chemicals including sodium cyanide.

== Operations and products ==
The company's principal products across its history included sulphuric acid, superphosphate and other fertilisers derived from bone dust, guano and imported phosphate rock. Later operations incorporated production of a wider range of industrial chemicals, reflecting both agricultural demand and mining industry requirements.

By the mid twentieth century, facilities were active in Victoria (Yarraville), South Australia (Port Adelaide), Western Australia (Bassendean, Kwinana) and New South Wales (Port Kembla).

== Notable people ==
=== James Cuming (1835–1911) ===
James Cuming was a Scottish-born farrier and chemist who emigrated to Victoria in 1862. In 1872 he co-founded Cuming, Smith & Co. and served as its leading figure for several decades. He was active in civic life, serving multiple terms on the Footscray council and as mayor in 1885–86 and 1890–91. He was also a benefactor, funding facilities at the University of Melbourne and local hospitals. From 1895 until his death in 1911, he was the longest serving president of the Footscray Football Club (later the Western Bulldogs), a title he still holds in 2025. A marble bust by sculptor Margaret Baskerville was commissioned in his honour and placed in Yarraville Gardens.

=== Robert Burns Cuming (1859–1910) ===
Robert Burns Cuming, son of James Cuming, established the Adelaide Chemical Works in 1882, which later became part of the Adelaide Chemical and Fertilizer Company. He served as mayor of Thebarton in 1893–94 and 1901–03.

=== James Cuming Jr. (1861–1920) ===
James Cuming Jr., son of James Cuming (1835–1911), directed operations as Cuming, Smith & Co. shifted from bone-based superphosphates to phosphate-rock fertilisers and expanded distribution in the Victorian wheat belt. Educated at Melbourne Church of England Grammar School (1876–1879), he later undertook analytical chemistry studies at the University of Melbourne and, after overseas study in 1884, became head chemist and then manager of the firm.

Following the 1897 amalgamation with Felton, Grimwade & Co., he served as general manager of the combined operations. He helped formalise price and marketing "gentlemen's agreements" with competitors, leading to the creation of the Victorian Fertilizer Association in 1907; he also introduced sickness and retirement benefits for employees. Cuming was a founder of the Society of Chemical Industry of Victoria and served as president in 1903 and 1914.

He died on 31 May 1920 at a private hospital in East Melbourne, at which time he was chairman of directors of Cuming, Smith & Co.; his funeral was widely attended by business leaders. In his memory, Cuming, Smith & Co. financed a lecture theatre and research laboratory in the School of Chemistry at the University of Melbourne.

=== William Fehon Cuming (1885–1933) ===
William Fehon Cuming, often referred to as "W.F." Cuming in contemporary reports, succeeded his father, James Cuming Jr., as managing director of Cuming, Smith & Co. in 1920.
He presided over the formation of Commonwealth Fertilizers and Chemicals Pty Ltd in 1929, created through the amalgamation of Cuming Smith & Co., Wischers Pty Ltd, Mount Lyell Mining & Railway Co. Ltd, and Nobel (Australia) Pty Ltd (ICIANZ).
He died on 14 May 1933 after a brief illness, at the age of 47, leaving behind a widely acknowledged legacy in the Australian fertiliser industry.
His younger brother, Mariannus Adrian "Mac" Cuming, was groomed as his successor and subsequently held a series of executive roles within the merged companies, including CF&C and CSBP.
"W. F." was also managing director of Cuming Smith Mount Lyell Farmers' Fertilisers CSML in Western Australia, and was well regarded in the Melbourne, and Australian community. He served as vice-president of the Victorian Chamber of Manufacturers, as a director of the Chamber of Manufacturers Insurance Ltd., and as an appointed member of the Melbourne University Council.

=== Sir Alexander Stewart (1874–1956) ===
Alexander Anderson Stewart married Grace Cuming in 1905 and joined the Cuming Smith board in 1911. He was later knighted in 1937 and held senior roles in Commonwealth Fertilisers and the Collins House Group of companies.

=== Mariannus Adrian "Mac" Cuming (1901–1988) ===
Mac Cuming served as chairman of CSBP from 1943 to 1971 and as a director of BHP and ICIANZ. He was appointed a Companion of the Order of St Michael and St George (CMG) in 1962 for contributions to business and community.

== Legacy and community contributions ==
Cuming, Smith & Co. and its successors played a role in the expansion of Australian agriculture by supplying superphosphate that enabled higher crop yields on nutrient-poor soils. The company's activities influenced regional development in Victoria, South Australia and Western Australia, and supported large-scale wheat production in the early twentieth century.

Members of the Cuming family contributed to civic and cultural life through philanthropy, service in municipal government, and involvement in organisations such as the Footscray Football Club. In 1930 the Victorian Chamber of Commerce established the James Cuming Memorial Scholarships at the University of Melbourne to commemorate the firm's founder.

The firm's industrial heritage is reflected in surviving structures at Yarraville and Port Adelaide, and its successor CSBP remains an active chemical and fertiliser producer within Wesfarmers Chemicals, Energy & Fertilisers.

== See also ==
- Adelaide Chemical Works
- Charles Gordon Campbell
- Commonwealth Fertilisers and Chemicals
- CSBP
- Fertiliser industry in Australia
- Footscray Football Club
- Frederick Sheppard Grimwade
- Imperial Chemical Industries Australia and New Zealand (ICIANZ)
- Wesfarmers
