= CSBP =

Company based in Western Australia

Corporate logo

CSBP Limited is an Australian fertiliser and chemical company based in Kwinana, Western Australia. It is a subsidiary of WesCEF, which in turn is part of Wesfarmers.

== Current operations ==
CSBP produces a number of products for the agricultural, mining, and industrial sectors, including fertilisers, industrial chemicals, polyvinyl chloride (PVC), and wood-plastic composites. It has two subsidiaries – Australian Vinyls (based in Laverton, Victoria) and ModWood Technologies (based in Campbellfield, Victoria). CSBP additionally holds joint ownership of Queensland Nitrate Project (QNP), a joint venture with Dyno Nobel.

CSBP has its head office in Kwinana. It has a soil and plant laboratory in Bibra Lake and regional fertiliser distribution centres in Albany, Bunbury, Esperance and Geraldton. There are also regional fertiliser depots in Corrigin, Dalwallinu, Goomalling, Merredin, Tambellup and Wagin.

== History ==
CSBP has its origins in Cuming Smith, which in 1910 began making fertilisers at Bassendean, under the Florida brand name. It was the first company in Australia to manufacture superphosphate.

=== CSML ===
In 1927, Cuming Smith, Mount Lyell Mining & Railway Company and Westralian Farmers Superphosphates established a new joint venture, Cuming Smith Mount Lyell Farmers Fertiliser Limited (CSML). Each held a one-third share. The establishment of CSML came at a time when the agricultural sector in Western Australia was rapidly expanding. With a capacity output of 240,000 tonnes per year, the company produced almost all of the superphosphate used in WA – a total of 1,925,000 tonnes in its first 20 years of operation.

CSML commissioned new plants in Bunbury and Geraldton in 1930, in order to reduce the distribution distance for their products. A plant in Albany was commissioned in 1954, and at the same time CSML and Cresco Fertilisers (a South Australian firm) formed a new joint venture, the Albany Superphosphate Company. Albany Superphosphate operated both in Albany and in Esperance, where a plant was established in 1962.

=== CSBP ===
In 1963, Boral (which had acquired Mount Lyell's interest) transferred that share to BP, and in 1964 the venture was renamed Cuming Smith British Petroleum & Farmers Ltd (commonly abbreviated to CSBP & Farmers) to reflect the new ownership by Cuming Smith, BP and Westralian Farmers.

CSBP commissioned superphosphate and sulphuric acid plants in Kwinana in 1967. The Kwinana Nitrogen Company was established the following year, as a joint venture between CSBP (20 percent) and BP (80 percent). In 1970, CSBP also took over its main rival, Cresco Fertilisers. As a result of these changes, the company's plants in Bassendean and North Fremantle ceased operations in 1971. Three additional plants in Kwinana were commissioned in the 1970s.

In October 1977, Wesfarmers launched a takeover bid for CSBP, valuing the company at $60 million. Driven by John Bennison, the deal did not go through until September 1979, after two years of protracted negotiations. At the time, it was the largest corporate takeover in Australian history.

During the 1980s, CSBP began to increase its emphasis on industrial chemicals. In 1986, Wesfarmers acquired BP's one-third shared in CSBP, becoming the sole owner. The following year, Wesfarmers also bought out BP's share in the Kwinana Nitrogen Company. In 1988, CSBP formed Australian Gold Reagents Limited (AGR) as a joint venture with Coogee Chemicals and the Australian Industry Development Corporation (AIDC). AIDC withdrew in 1997, leaving CSBP with a 75 percent share. CSBP began trading as Wesfarmers CSBP in 1995, being rebranded CSBP in 2003.
