= Commonwealth Fertilisers and Chemicals =

Former Australian fertiliser and chemical company

Commonwealth Fertilisers and Chemicals Pty Ltd
- Type: Private
- Industry: Fertilisers; industrial chemicals
- Predecessor: Cuming Smith; Wischer & Company; Mount Lyell Mining & Railway Company; Nobel (ICIANZ)
- Founded: 1929
- Defunct: Later absorbed into ICIANZ
- Fate: Amalgamated into ICIANZ operations
- Successor: Imperial Chemical Industries Australia and New Zealand
- Headquarters: Melbourne, Victoria, Australia
- Area served: Australia
- Products: Superphosphate; fertilisers; sulphuric acid; industrial chemicals

Commonwealth Fertilisers and Chemicals Pty Ltd (CF&C) was an Australian fertiliser and chemical manufacturer established in 1929 through the amalgamation of Cuming Smith, Wischer & Company, Mount Lyell Mining & Railway Company, and Nobel (the Australian arm of Imperial Chemical Industries).

The company was created to consolidate fertiliser manufacture in Victoria and to improve competitive strength against rival producers such as Pivot Farmers’ Co-operative. Cuming, Smith & Co. retained a controlling interest, and its managing director, William Fehon (W.F.) Cuming, continued to lead the amalgamated firm.

Production was centralised at the Yarraville works in Melbourne, with older facilities including the Port Melbourne plant closed following the merger. This rationalisation allowed the company to expand capacity and lower costs while serving Victorian and interstate agricultural markets.

In subsequent decades, CF&C was drawn into the expanding structure of Imperial Chemical Industries Australia and New Zealand (ICIANZ), which absorbed its assets and operations as part of ICI's broader Australasian presence in fertilisers, chemicals, and explosives.
