= Imperial Chemical Industries Australia and New Zealand =

Subsidiary of ICI, 1928–1998

- Type: Subsidiary
- Industry: Chemicals; fertilisers; explosives; paints; plastics
- Predecessor: Cuming, Smith & Co.; Commonwealth Fertilisers and Chemicals
- Founded: 1928
- Defunct: 1998 (renamed Orica)
- Fate: Renamed following parent-company restructuring
- Successor: Orica
- Headquarters: Melbourne, Victoria, Australia
- Area served: Australia; New Zealand
- Products: Fertilisers; industrial chemicals; explosives; paints; plastics
- Parent: Imperial Chemical Industries (1928–1998)

Imperial Chemical Industries Australia and New Zealand Limited (ICIANZ) was the Australasian subsidiary of the British chemical conglomerate Imperial Chemical Industries (ICI). Established in 1928, it grew into one of Australia's largest manufacturing companies, producing fertilisers, explosives, plastics, paints, and industrial chemicals.

ICIANZ absorbed several pre-existing Australian enterprises, including Cuming, Smith & Co. and Commonwealth Fertilisers and Chemicals, and consolidated them under ICI ownership. At its peak, it employed tens of thousands and supplied products essential to agriculture, mining, construction, and manufacturing across Australia and New Zealand.

In 1971 the company changed its name from Imperial Chemical Industries of Australia and New Zealand to ICI Australia. Following ICI plc’s divestment of its majority shareholding in 1997, ICI Australia adopted the name Orica on 2 February 1998.

== History ==
=== Establishment (1928) ===
Imperial Chemical Industries (ICI) was formed in Britain in 1926 through the merger of Nobel Industries, Brunner, Mond & Co., United Alkali Company, and British Dyestuffs Corporation. In Australasia, ICI operated via Imperial Chemical Industry (Australasia) Limited, which in 1928 was renamed Imperial Chemical Industries of Australia and New Zealand Limited (ICIANZ) to coordinate the group’s activities in Australia and New Zealand.

=== Executive integration ===
Following the consolidation of fertiliser assets (including the later 1961 acquisition of Commonwealth Fertilisers and Chemicals), senior figures from Cuming, Smith & Co. continued in leadership roles within the enlarged enterprise. Industrial chemist and company director Mariannus Adrian ("Mac") Cuming—a long-time executive of Cuming Smith and CF&C—served as a director of ICIANZ, reflecting continuity between the pre-acquisition fertiliser businesses and ICI’s Australasian company.

=== Expansion through mergers ===
Through the late 1920s and 1930s, ICIANZ absorbed local chemical and fertiliser companies, most notably Cuming, Smith & Co. (founded 1872) and Commonwealth Fertilisers and Chemicals (formed 1929). These acquisitions gave ICIANZ dominant positions in fertiliser production, industrial chemicals, and explosives.

=== Wartime production ===
On the eve of the Second World War, ICIANZ installed a high-pressure synthetic ammonia plant at Deer Park in line with the push for home-based production of key intermediates. Construction began in January 1939 and the plant was in production by April 1940. Ammonia was oxidised to nitric acid on site, and together these fed the manufacture of ammonium nitrate for munitions as well as fertiliser lines.

Activity at the wartime works is documented in contemporary images showing laboratory operations and plant infrastructure at ICI Deer Park in May 1944.

=== Postwar diversification ===
In the postwar decades, ICIANZ diversified beyond explosives into synthetic fibres, resins, paints and plastics. Contemporary summaries note new product lines such as polyethylene film and ammonia alongside expanded chemical manufacturing and pigments operations. Its Dulux paints division became a major national manufacturer in the consumer coatings market, documented through extensive corporate and archival records.

By the late 1960s, ICIANZ was described as Australia’s largest chemical company and a leading manufacturing enterprise, supported by a nationwide network of plants and research laboratories (including the Ascot Vale research laboratories opened in 1956).

=== Transition to Orica (1998) ===
In 1971 the company was renamed ICI Australia from its earlier title ICIANZ. Following ICI plc’s divestment of its majority shareholding in 1997, the Australian company adopted the name Orica on 2 February 1998, continuing as an independent, Melbourne-based chemicals and explosives group.

== Operations ==
ICIANZ’s operations encompassed:

- Explosives and blasting agents – large-scale manufacture at the Deer Park works supplying mining and defence, with on-site ammonia–nitric acid–ammonium nitrate capacity established by 1940.
- Fertilisers and industrial acids – sulphuric and nitric acid production and superphosphate manufacture; in 1961 the company acquired Commonwealth Fertilisers and Chemicals Ltd (which included the long-established Cuming, Smith & Co. assets).
- Paints and coatings – operation of the Dulux paints business in Australia and New Zealand (later demerged as DuluxGroup in 2010).
- Pigments – participation in Pigment Manufacturers of Australia Ltd (PMA Ltd), a joint venture producing titanium dioxide and other pigments for the coatings industry.
- Plastics and polymers – growth into polyethylene/PVC and related intermediates alongside Melbourne’s post-war petrochemical development at Altona and Laverton; EOAS notes the company’s polyethylene film production among post-war product lines.
- Research and technical services – a nationwide technical network anchored by the Central Research Laboratories at Ascot Vale (opened 1956) supporting process and product development.

== Legacy ==
ICIANZ played a central role in Australia’s twentieth-century industrialisation. Contemporary accounts characterise it as the country’s largest chemical enterprise by the late 1960s, with a nationwide network of plants and research laboratories; the Deer Park complex is separately recognised for having grown into “one of the largest explosives, chemical and plastics manufacturers in Australia.”

Successor companies continue major parts of its portfolio. Orica adopted its name in 1998 and remains an Australian-based multinational in explosives and industrial chemicals; DuluxGroup was demerged from Orica in 2010; and the bulk chemicals business was sold to funds advised by Blackstone in 2014–15 and now trades as Ixom.

== See also ==
- Imperial Chemical Industries
- Orica
- Orica House
- Cuming, Smith & Co.
- Commonwealth Fertilisers and Chemicals
- Ixom
- Deer Park, Victoria
