= Orica =

Australian-based multinational corporation

Orica Limited

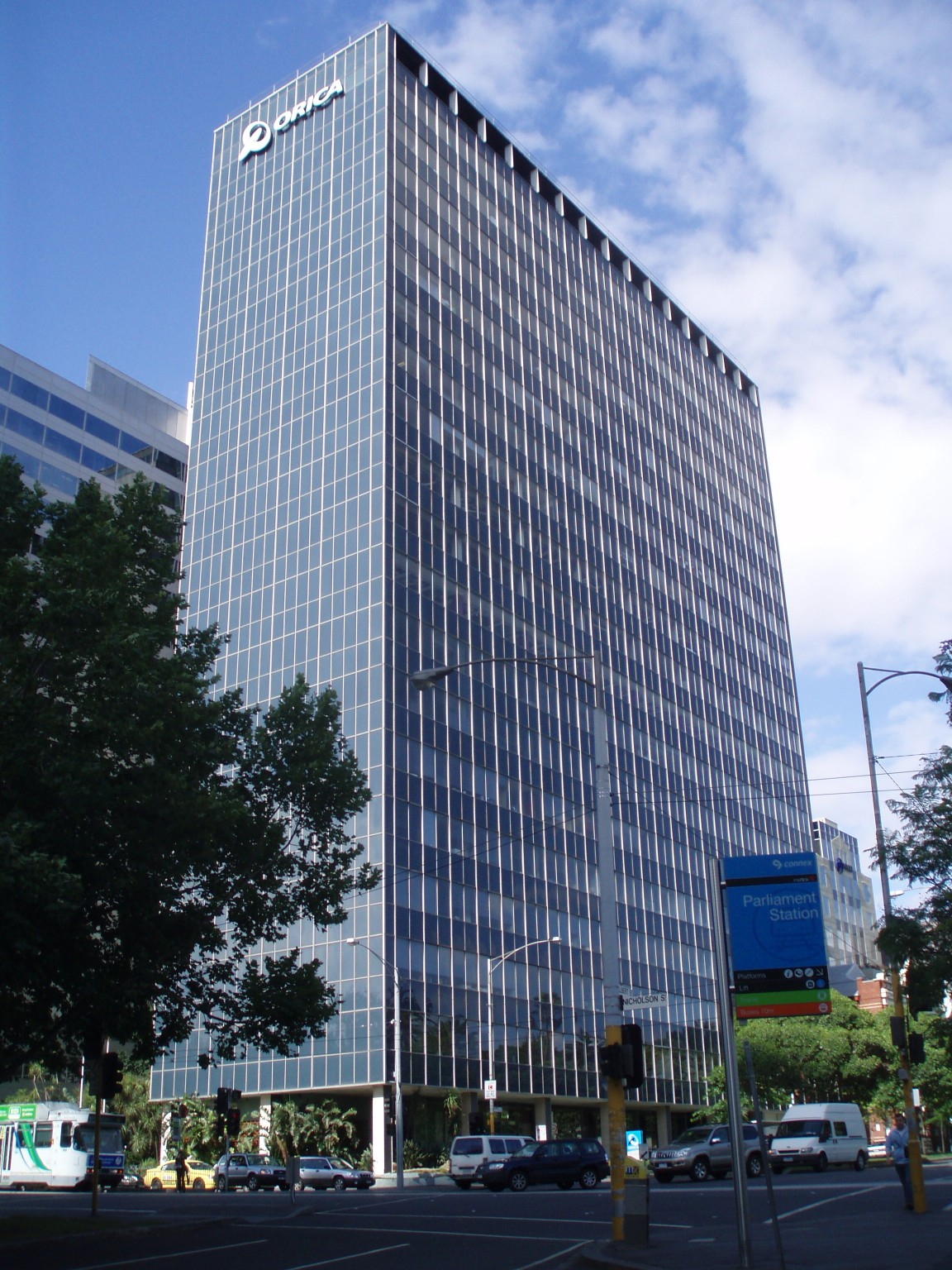
- Orica House, the company headquarters
- Formerly: ICI Australia
- Type: Public
- Traded as: ASX: ORI
- Industry: Metals, mining, oil and gas, construction, tunnelling
- Founded: 1874
- Headquarters: Orica House; East Melbourne, Victoria, Australia
- Key people: Malcolm Broomhead (Non-Executive Director & Chairman); Sanjeev Gandhi (Managing Director & CEO)
- Products: Explosives, Sodium cyanide, Ground support
- Revenue: ▲AU$7.1 billion (2021/22)
- Operating income: ▲AU$374 million (2021/22)
- Net income: ▲AU$49 million (2021/22)
- Total assets: ▲AU$8.4 billion (September 2022)
- Total equity: ▲AU$3.7 billion (September 2022)
- Number of employees: 15,000 (2021)
- Website: www.orica.com

Orica Limited (ASX: ORI) is an Australian-based multinational corporation that is one of the world's largest providers of commercial explosives and blasting systems to the mining, quarrying, oil and gas, and construction markets, a supplier of sodium cyanide for gold extraction, and a specialist provider of ground support services in mining and tunnelling.

Orica has a workforce of around 15,000 employees and contractors, servicing customers across more than 100 countries. Orica is listed on the Australian Securities Exchange. It has in recent years been subject to a number of high-profile industrial accidents and fatalities.

== History ==
Founded in 1874 as Jones, Scott and Co, a supplier of explosives during the Victorian gold rush, the company was bought by Nobel Industries. Nobel later merged with several British chemical manufacturers to form Imperial Chemical Industries. In 1928, Imperial Chemical Industries of Australia and New Zealand (ICIANZ) was incorporated to acquire and coordinate all of its Australasian interests.

In July 1997, ICI Australia became an independent Australasian company after Imperial Chemical Industries, divested its 62.4 per cent shareholding in the company. ICI Australia was required to change its name and on 2 February 1998 was rebranded as Orica.

In 2010, Orica spun off Dulux leaving the company to focus on the provision of services to the mining, construction and infrastructure industries.

In November 2014, Orica sold its chemicals business to the Blackstone Group. The sale was completed on 2 March 2015, and the chemicals business now operates under the name Ixom.

The chemicals operations that were divested trace their roots to nineteenth-century Australian industrial chemistry, notably including firms such as Cuming, Smith & Co., which through a series of mergers became part of Imperial Chemical Industries Australia and New Zealand (ICI ANZ), later transitioning into Orica’s chemicals division.

In 2018, Orica acquired GroundProbe, a provider of monitoring and measurement technologies for mining.

In 2020, Orica acquired Essa, a manufacturer and distributor of industrial explosives in Peru.

In 2023, Orica acquired Terra Insights and Cyanco.

== Financial performance ==
Orica's revenue in 2016 was AUD$5.1 billion and statutory net profit after tax (NPAT) attributable to the shareholders of Orica for the full year ended 30 September 2016 was $343 million.

== Sustainability ==
Orica is a member of the Dow Jones Sustainability Index, the Australian SAM Sustainability Index (AuSSI) and the FTSE4Good Index. These Indexes provide a benchmark for the performance of investments in sustainable companies and funds. Orica releases an annual Sustainability Report that outlines performance against key sustainability metrics.

In 2014, Orica was identified as a global leader in natural capital decoupling, which shows the ability of organisations to "decouple" financial growth from environmental impact, by increasing revenue whilst decreasing their absolute impact.

== Markets/industries ==
Orica operates across the following markets and industries:

- Surface metal
- Surface coal
- Underground mining
- Underground construction
- Construction
- Quarrying
- Oil and gas

== Products and services ==
Orica operates three primary business areas:

=== Blasting ===
Orica is one of the world's largest provider of commercial explosives and blasting systems to the mining, quarrying, oil and gas, and construction markets.

=== Products and services ===
- Contracted services
- Initiators
- Boosters
- Bulk explosives
- Packaged explosives
- Data, reporting & analytics
- Supplementary services
- Seismic systems

=== Minova ===
Minova is no longer a member of the Orica Group. Products and services include:

- Steel bolts and plates
- Glassfibre reinforced polymer bolts
- Injectable chemicals and foams
- Mesh
- Resin capsules
- Cementitious grouts & coatings
- Pumps
- Soil anchoring systems
- Ballast bonding polymers
- Accessories and engineering services

=== Sodium cyanide ===
Orica is a supplier of sodium cyanide for gold extraction.

Products and services include:

- Analysers
- PRO service
- Data, reporting & analytics
- Sparge
- Training

== Headquarters ==
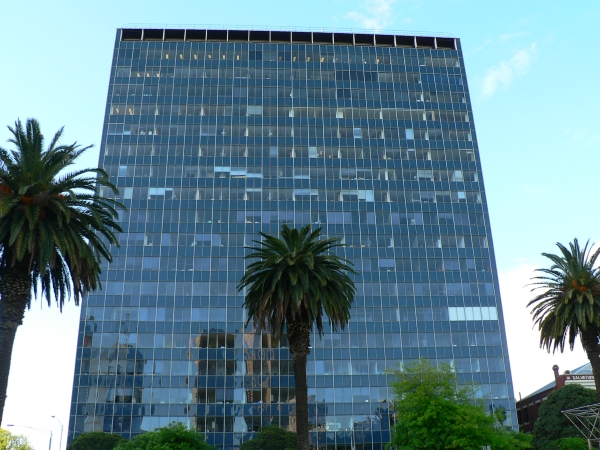
Orica House

Once Australia's tallest building, the companies headquarters, Orica House in East Melbourne, was Australia's tallest during the 1950s and was one of the first high-rise buildings in Australia's cities.

== Incidents ==
=== Corporate ===
==== Bullying scandal ====
In March 2015, then CEO Ian Smith was ousted from the business due to bullying of a female employee. During Smith's tenure as CEO, some of the senior leadership within the organisation left for other companies. Alberto Calderon replaced Ian Smith in 2015 until 2020. Orica's earnings post Ian Smith's departure experienced a significant decline as well as incurred multiple extraordinary charges. During this time there was also significant turnover within the executive leadership team.

=== In Australia ===
==== Botany, New South Wales ====
===== Organochlorines in the Botany aquifer =====
Remediation began in 2005 after production of chlorinated solvents by ICI over many years resulted in significant contamination of the Botany aquifer, a high-quality sand aquifer located below the eastern suburbs of Sydney, New South Wales. The main chemical contaminant found in groundwater around the old ICI site is EDC (1,2-dichloroethane), a persistent organic pollutant and byproduct of the manufacture of PVC. Orica has built an A$167 million Groundwater Treatment Plant (GTP) to achieve containment of this contamination and provide high quality industrial water to Botany Industrial Park. Water produced by Orica's GTP saves Sydney's potable water supply around 5 megalitres (1.1 million imperial gallons; 1.3 million US gallons) per day (approx 0.5% of Sydney's water demand). Residents in the area were banned from accessing the groundwater. Orica estimated in 2012 that the GTP had been in operation for seven years of its 30-year design life cycle.

===== Mercury leak, 2011 =====
The Botany chemical plant released mercury vapour into the atmosphere on 27 September 2011, breaching environmental standards for nine hours. An air monitor located near residents at Banksmeadow detected the mercury vapour and the Office of Environment & Heritage (OEH) was notified. Dr Mariann Lloyd-Smith, said the length of time the emissions lasted was extraordinary, "Mercury is extremely toxic. It is recognised as one of the most important and most hazardous toxins that we deal with, and there is currently a UN negotiation for a global treaty on mercury to address this," she said. The mercury vapour was associated with mercury which had polluted the soil on the Orica site, due to leaking pipes. Robyn Parker, the New South Wales Minister for the Environment & Heritage said "I am incredibly angry and disappointed that yet again we have another incident with Orica." In January 2013, the NSW EPA announced that it would conduct a review of off-site emissions of mercury.

===== Mercury leak, 2012 =====
On 17 January 2012 Orica reported a mercury leak at its Port Botany plant, the second mercury incident since August 2011. In a series of samples of environmental air, the EPA recorded a mercury level of 0.0049 grams per cubic metre (8.3×10^{−6} pounds per cubic yard); more than double the regulatory limit of 0.002 grams per cubic metre (3.4×10^{−6} pounds per cubic yard). The leak occurred in December 2011 and Orica failed to report the leak to authorities until the following month. The site of the breach was the thermal desorbtion stack at the company's carpark waste remediation project, which was closed when the breach occurred. The New South Wales Environment Protection Authority said the incident was not linked to the mercury emissions breach in September at Orica's other Botany site on Beauchamp Road.

==== Gladstone, Queensland ====
===== Cyanide leaks, 2012 =====
On 8 June 2012 the Queensland Department of Environment & Science launched a legal prosecution against Orica in the Gladstone Magistrates' Court. The company was charged with 279 counts of willfully contravening its approvals in relation to alleged cyanide leaks into Gladstone Harbour. The government claimed that in January and February 2012, Orica discharged effluent water containing heightened levels of cyanide into Gladstone Harbour. "The charges are related to allegations that the company did not inform The Department of the Environment. The charges related to a breach of conditions rather than any environmental harm per se".

==== Kooragang, New South Wales ====
Throughout August and December 2011 Orica had six major chemicals incidents or leaks in Australia. The first one was a leak of hexavalent chromium from its ammonium nitrate plant near Stockton that affected 70 households; the second one was the release of arsenic into the Hunter River at Newcastle; the third was of mercury vapours from its Botany site; the fourth was a leak of ammonia from its site at Kooragang; the fifth was an ammonium nitrate leak of 20,000 litres (4,400 imperial gallons; 5,300 US gallons) at its Kooragang Island plant, only a day after being allowed to reopen; and the sixth incident was a sulphuric acid leak of approximately 3,000–4,000 litres (660–880 imp gal; 790–1,060 US gal) at its Port Kembla site. The fourth leak triggered a public forum and NSW Government investigation into the leaks, and the temporary shut down of the Kooragang Island plant.

===== Hexavalent chromium leak, 2011 =====
Orica's Kooragang Island chemical plant released hexavalent chromium into the atmosphere on 8 August 2011. The known carcinogen was released between 6 and 6:30pm and the spill continued for approximately 20 minutes. An estimated 1 kilogram (2.2 lb) of hexavalent chromium was discharged from the Orica plant, with another 35–60 grams (1.2–2.1 oz) over the suburb of Stockton. Approximately 20 workers at the plant were exposed as well as 70 nearby homes in Stockton. Orica failed to notify government authorities until 16 hours after the incident and residents were not formally notified for three days. Under a Prevention Notice issued on 11 August 2011, the OEH closed the ammonia plant at Kooragang Island. The hexavalent chromium leak was the subject of a New South Wales Parliament Upper House inquiry that was concluded in February 2012.

===== Hunter River arsenic leak, 2011 =====
Effluent containing high levels of arsenic leaked into the Hunter River from the Kooragang Island chemical plant on 19 August 2011 at 3pm. Arsenic had not been used on the site since 1993, however during a cleanup of a hexavalent chromium spill on the site the week prior, old deposits of arsenic leaked into a storage pond and drained into the Hunter River. It was estimated the arsenic concentration was 0.067 milligrams per litre, exceeding licence limits. Barry O'Farrell, the Premier of New South Wales, said "two spills in a fortnight raise reasonable concerns about systemic failures in the way in which this company is operating its facilities." O'Farrell continued, "I've had a gutful of families being distressed, by potential threats to their safety and threats to their local environment."

===== Ammonia leak, 2011 =====
On 9 November 2011 more than 900 kilograms (2,000 lb) of ammonia was initially suspected of venting to the atmosphere from the Kooragang Island plant during a 45-minute period. The venting was due to a relief valve operating to prevent overpressure of a liquid ammonia tank. Engineering studies subsequently revised the amount down to ~90 kilograms (200 lb). The leak was identified by firefighters responding to an alarm raised by the hospitalisation of two railway workers at Mayfield who were affected by the plume of escaping gas. Six fire units and a hazardous chemicals unit were called to the chemical plant to deal with the leak of the ammonia gas. Despite initial statements by Orica that the leak posed no public health risk, two rail workers in the nearby suburb of Mayfield East were overcome by ammonia fumes and were taken to hospital with breathing difficulties. Less than an hour before the ammonia leak, the Environment Protection Authority announced it would take Orica to court over the hexavalent chromium leak which occurred on 8 August 2011 at the same plant.

===== Ammonium nitrate leak, 2011 =====
On 7 December 2011, in excess of 20,000 litres (4,400 imp gal; 5,300 US gal) of weak ammonium nitrate (<35%) solution/fertiliser leaked onto grassed areas at the Kooragang Island chemical plant. Emergency services were called to the site including a HAZMAT team. The spill occurred less than a day after the Environmental Protection Authority announced it would allow the reopening of part of the Kooragang Island plant. Local residents continued to criticise the company for failing to notify residents in a timely manner and called for the plant to remain closed.

===== Hydrogen stack fire, 2012 =====
On 8 January 2012 lightning ignited hydrogen being released from the plant. Flames higher than 20 metres (66 ft) leapt from the hydrogen stack and were reported by local residents to authorities.

==== Port Kembla, New South Wales ====
===== Sulphuric acid leak, 2011 =====
A spill of approximately 3,000–4,000 litres (660–880 imperial gallons; 790–1,060 US gallons) of concentrated sulphuric acid occurred at the Port Kembla chemical plant on 16 December 2011. The leak was suspected to be caused by a hole in the ship-to-shore pipeline. Acting chief environmental regulator Mark Gifford from the NSW EPA said he was concerned about the ongoing incidents with Orica.

=== In Mexico ===
==== Coahuila ====
===== Explosion, 2007 =====
On 10 September 2007, 28 people were killed and over 250 injured in Coahuila, Mexico, as a result of an accident between a pick-up and a truck which resulted in an explosion. The truck was transporting about 25 metric tons of dynamite under contract for the company Orica near the cities of Monclova and Cuatro Ciénegas. Exact numbers of the dead and injured vary according to source. Orica's website stated there were a total of 28 fatalities in 2007—one worker and 27 contractors/members of the public.
