= Orica House =

Office building in Melbourne, Victoria

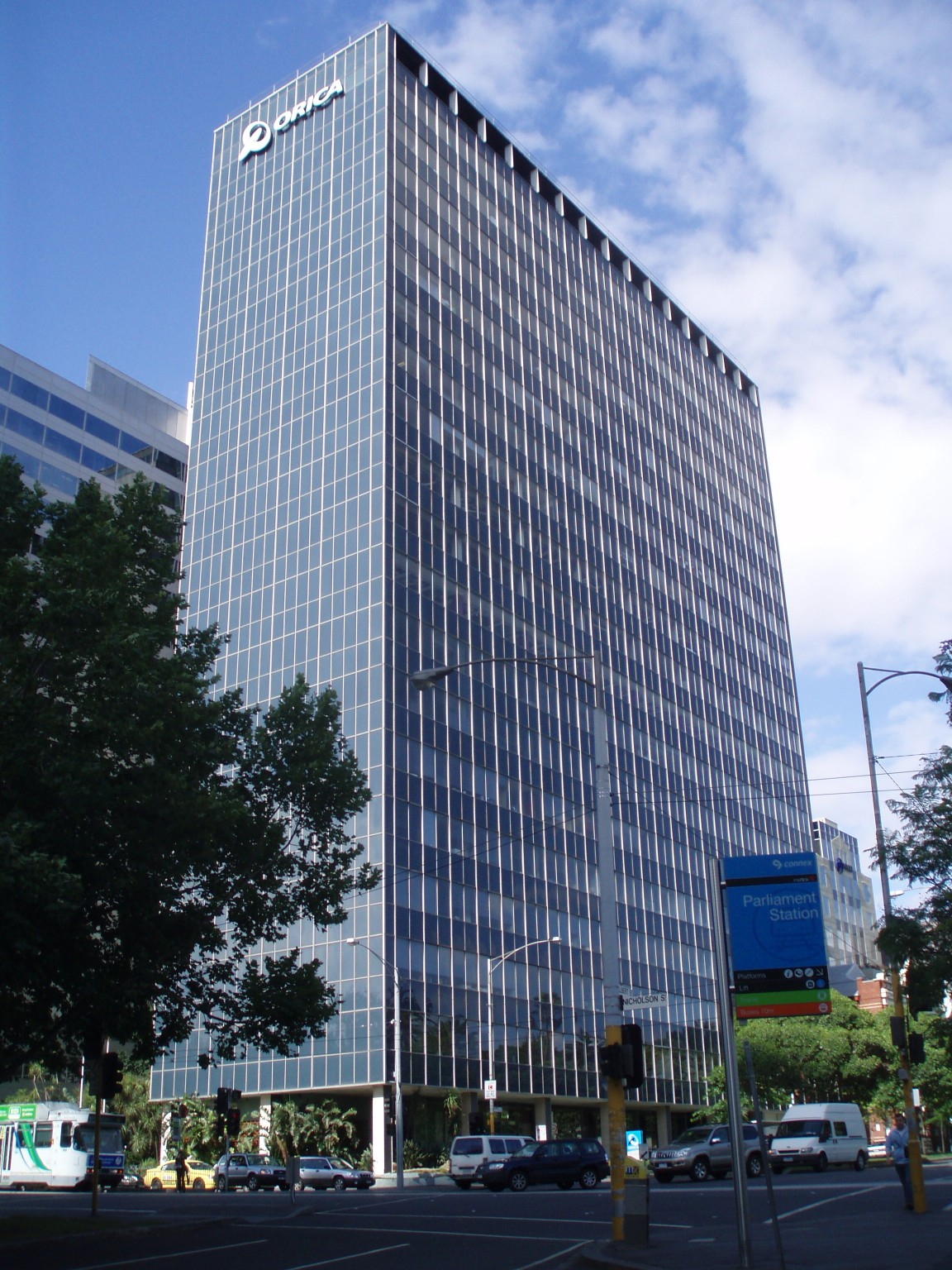
- Orica House in 2007

General information
- Architectural style: International style
- Location: 1 Nicholson Street, Melbourne, Australia
- Coordinates: 37°48′32″S 144°58′24″E
- Construction started: 1955
- Completed: 1958
- Client: Imperial Chemical Industries

Technical details
- Structural system: 81 metres, 20 floors

Design and construction
- Architect: Bates Smart McCutcheon

Australian National Heritage List
- Official name: Orica House (formerly the ICI Building)
- Type: Historic
- Criteria: a, f
- Designated: 21 September 2005; 21 years ago
- Reference no.: 105747

Victorian Heritage Register
- Official name: ICI House
- Type: Commercial
- Reference no.: VHR H0786
- Heritage Overlay Number: HO165
- Category: Commercial

Orica House (formerly ICI House) is a 19-storey office building at 1 Nicholson Street, East Melbourne, in Victoria, Australia. Begun in 1955 to house the headquarters of the Australian subsidiary of Imperial Chemical Industries (since spun off as an independent public company and renamed Orica), it was the tallest building in Australia upon completion in 1958. It broke Melbourne's longstanding 132 ft height limit and was the first International Style skyscraper in the country. It symbolised progress, modernity, efficiency and corporate power in post-war Melbourne, and heralded the construction of high-rise office buildings, changing the shape of Australia's major urban centres forever.

The building's design, by Osborn McCutcheon (of Bates Smart McCutcheon) was closely modelled on the best of corporate design being pioneered in the United States with all-glass high-rises such as the United Nations Secretariat Building. Detail and documentation of the building's design was managed by Douglas Gardiner who was a partner of BSM.

Soon after construction, panes of the coloured glass shattered and fell to the street below due to impurities and the heat of Melbourne's summers.

Orica House was added to the Victorian Heritage Register on 21 March 1990 for its architectural significance to the state of Victoria. On 21 September 2005, Orica House became the first post-war office building to be added to the Australian National Heritage List.
