= Dyno Nobel =

Swedish explosives manufacturer

- Type: Subsidiary
- Industry: Explosives (Coal, Quarry & Construction, Metals & Coal Mining) & Chemicals (Agriculture & Industrial)
- Founded: Sweden in 1865
- Headquarters: Brisbane, Australia & Cottonwood Heights, Utah, USA
- Key people: Mauro Neves de Moraes, Chief Executive Officer and Managing Director, Incitec Pivot Limited; Tanya Rybarczyk, President, Dyno Nobel Asia Pacific; Greg Hayne, President, Dyno Nobel Americas
- Products: Industrial / Commercial Explosives, Agriculture and Industrial Chemicals
- Revenue: DNAP A$626.4 million (2012) DNA US$1,203.3 million (2012)
- Number of employees: ~3,000 (2013)
- Parent: Incitec Pivot Limited (IPL)
- Subsidiaries: Nitromak dnx Kimya Sanayii, dnx Drilling, Tradestar, DynoNobel Transportation
- Website: www.dynonobel.com.au www.dynonobel.com www.dynonobel.ca www.dynonobel.lat

Dyno Nobel is a manufacturer of explosives and related products for mining and quarrying. It is a wholly owned subsidiary of Incitec Pivot Limited. It operates in Australia, Canada, the United States, Africa, Indonesia, Mexico, South America, Papua New Guinea and Turkey.

The company provides the explosives used in coal and metal mining, quarry and construction as well as pipeline and seismic used for oil and gas exploration. The types of explosives manufactured includes ammonium nitrate and dynamite. It makes electric, non-electric, and electronic detonators, detonating cord and cast boosters. It also produces surface and underground loading systems. In 2012 Dyno Nobel had over a million tons of ammonium nitrate capacity and over 30 manufacturing facilities on two continents.

== History ==
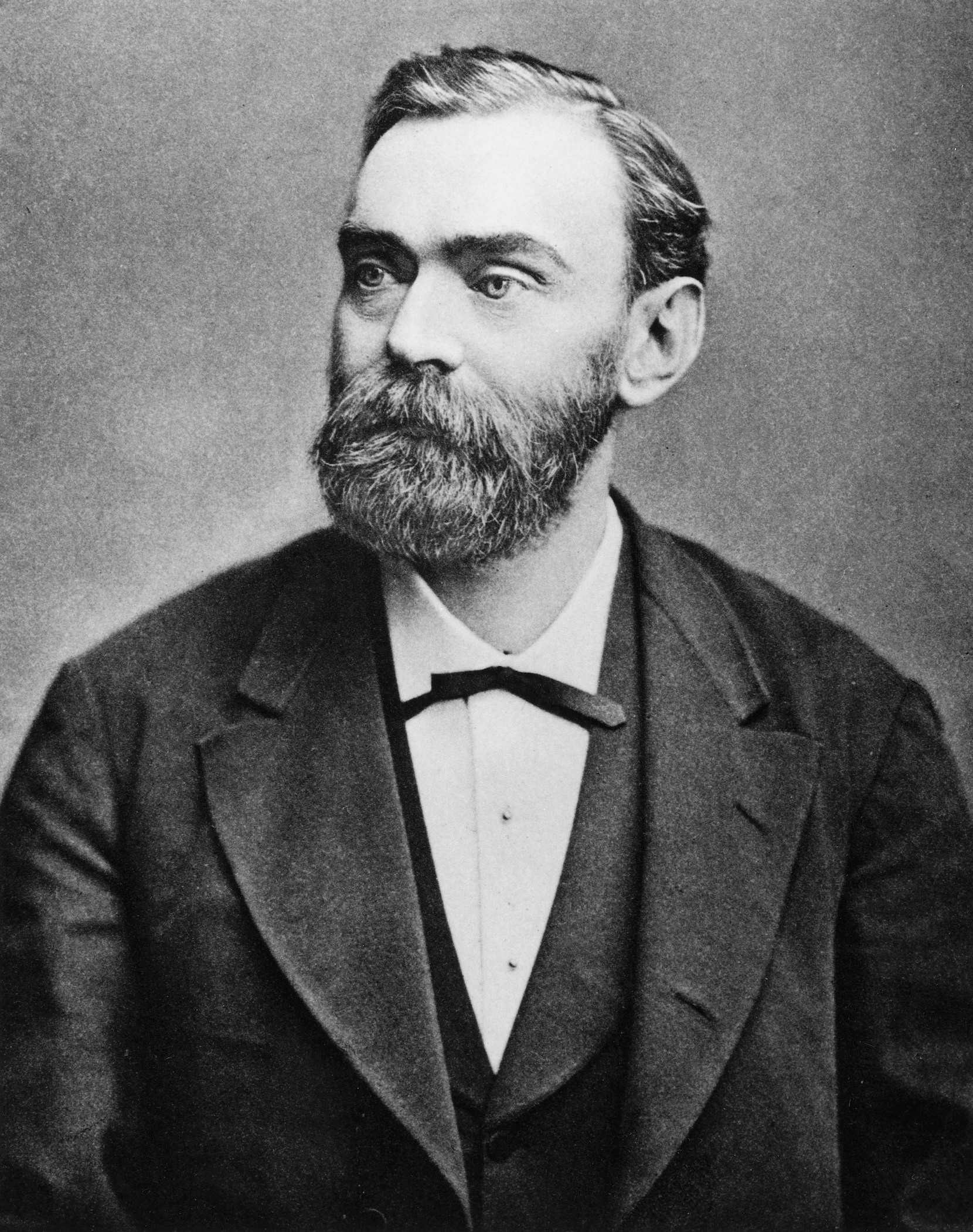
Alfred Nobel, Swedish dynamite inventor and founder of companies that laid the groundwork for Dyno Nobel

Dyno Nobel's history dates back to 1865 with Swedish dynamite inventor Alfred Nobel. The invention of the safety fuse by William Bickford in 1831 was also instrumental in the company's development.

Following IK Partners' (formerly Industri Kapital) public-to-private acquisition of Dyno ASA from the Oslo Stock Exchange in August 2000, Dyno's chemical business was merged with Neste Chemicals to form Dynea Oy, also controlled by IK.

Dyno Nobel ASA combined with the Ensign-Bickford Company in 2003 and were restructured again in 2005. By 2007 they had over 3,500 employees and 36 manufacturing facilities. In 2008 Australian agrochemical maker Incitec Pivot Limited (an ASX Top 50 company) bought Dyno Nobel for A$3.3 billion. After the coal company Peabody Energy filed for bankruptcy in April 2016, Dyno Nobel was listed as their largest creditor being owed more than A$4.3 million.

== Company organization ==
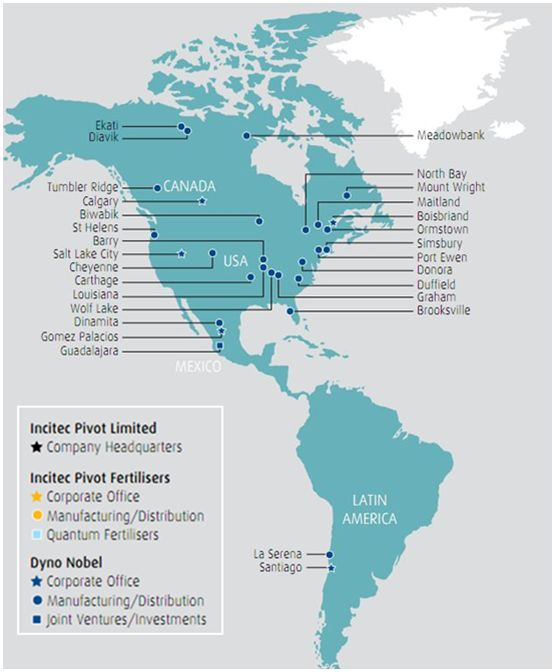
Dyno Nobel Manufacturing/Distribution, Joint Ventures/Investments & Corporate Headquarters - Americas

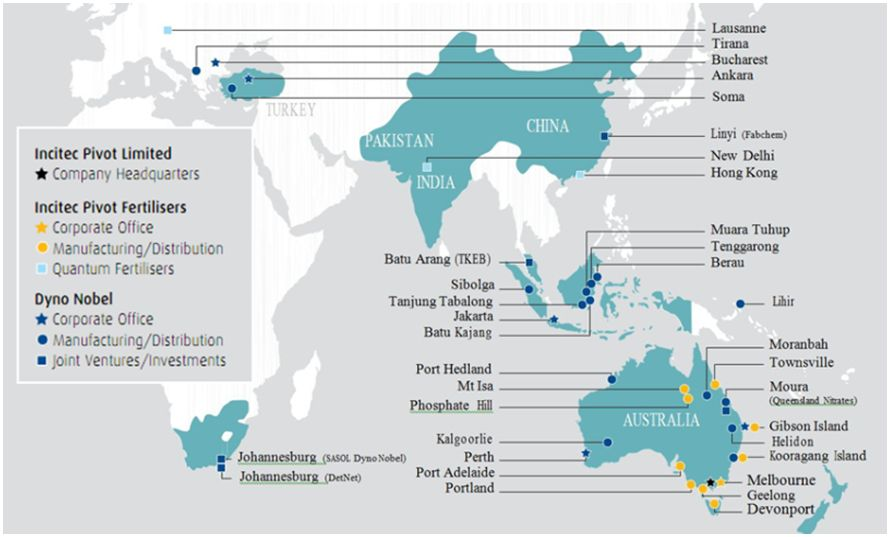
Dyno Nobel Manufacturing/Distribution, Joint Ventures/Investments & Corporate Headquarters

Dyno Nobel is organized into two groups, Dyno Americas and Dyno Nobel Asia Pacific.

=== Dyno Nobel Americas (DNA) ===
Dyno Nobel Americas (DNA) serves North America and Chile. DNA also supplies nitrogen based products to agricultural and industrial chemical markets.

=== Dyno Nobel Asia Pacific (DNAP) ===
Dyno Nobel Asia Pacific (DNAP) supplies the mining industry in Australia, Europe, China, Africa, Turkey, Indonesia, and Papua New Guinea. In particular, DNAP supplies surface and underground mining in the thermal coal, metallurgical coal, iron ore and other metals sectors.

== Sustainability ==
In 2010, Dyno Nobel's owners, Incitec Pivot Limited, approved a sustainability strategy that extends to workplace health and safety, environmental impacts, resource efficiency, community impact and engagement, as well as labor practices and products and services. In the 2012 Sustainability Report IPL states, "Sustainable growth requires us to balance our economic performance with our environmental and social responsibilities which include being a good corporate citizen and operating ethically."

=== Health and safety ===
In 2012, IPL reported that the Total Recordable Injury Frequency Rate was 1.45, an increase of 17% from the previous year. In response to this, the IPL Board and Executive Team implemented new positions and structures in the company's leadership. This was done to support a new Health, Safety and Environment (HSE) strategy put in place to eliminate workplace injuries, illnesses and environmental incidents.

=== Environment ===
In 2012, IPL established reduction targets for its Australian manufacturing operations for greenhouse gas emissions, water use, natural gas use for energy, and waste to landfill. They claim they are working to establish a baseline for future efficiency targets through gathering data from the global operations for energy use, water use and waste. They investigated the possibility of replacing the current materials used to manufacture bulking agents with recycled or renewable ones such as bio-fuels and green waste. The company carried out trials where waste oil was used in their fuel phase emulsion explosive product. They also researched ways to reduce nitrogen oxide (NOx) emissions from explosive blasting by using different products or blasting techniques.

=== Recruitment and training ===
During 2012, the number of females employed by the company increased from 17% to 21%. The number of female graduates employed through the graduate recruitment programme increased from none in 2012 to five in 2013. In comparison, the national average for women in the workplace in the United States was 47% (2010) and 46% in Australia (2013).
