= Coles Group =

Australian public company

Coles Group Limited

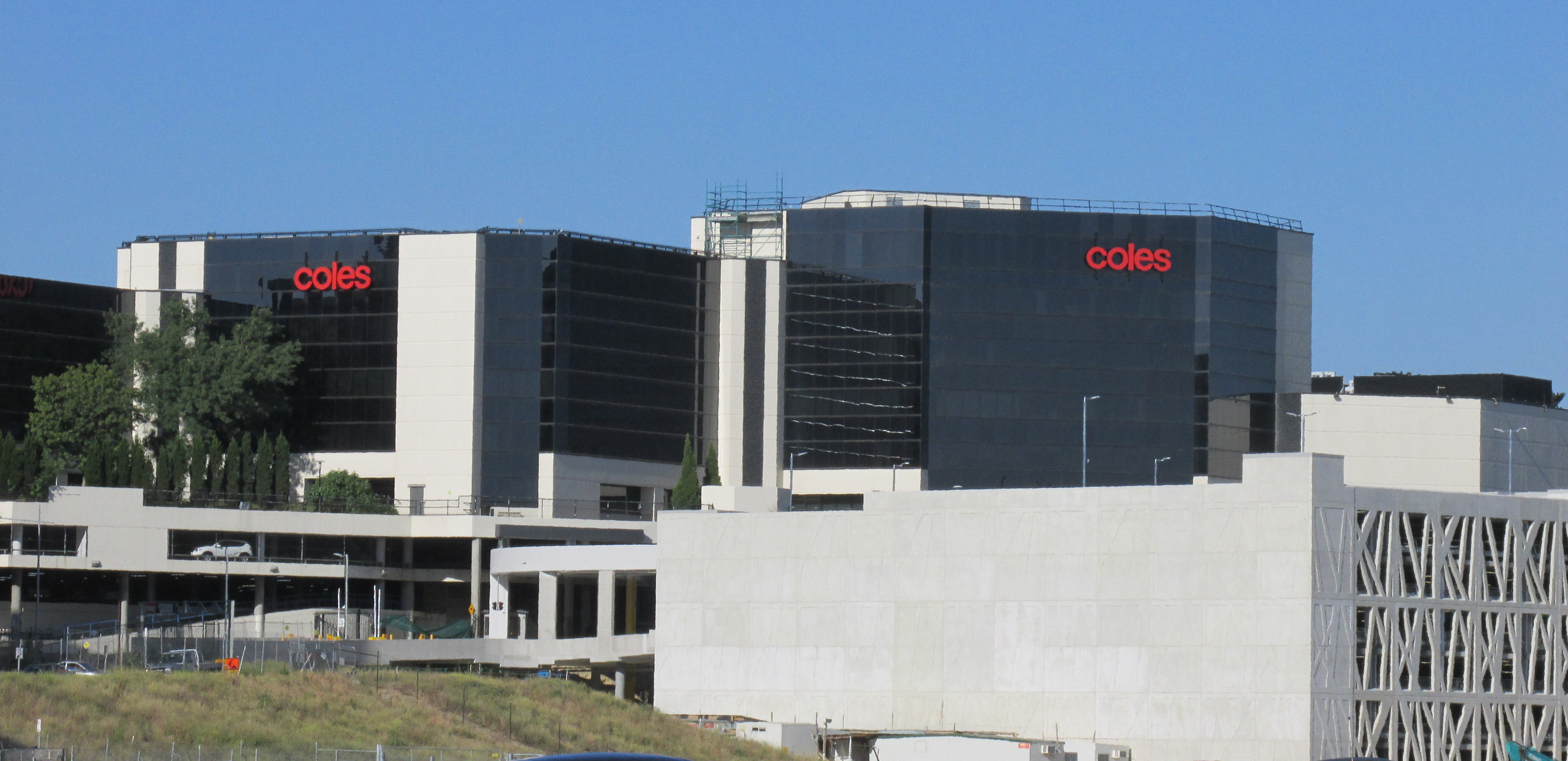
- Headquarters in Hawthorn East, Victoria, Australia
- Type: Public
- Traded as: ASX: COL; S&P/ASX 200 component
- Industry: Consumer staples
- Predecessors: Coles Myer Ltd; Wesfarmers (spun-off)
- Founded: 9 April 1914; 112 years ago Collingwood, Victoria, Australia
- Founder: George Coles
- Headquarters: 800 Toorak Road, Hawthorn East, Victoria, Australia
- Number of locations: 1,858 stores (2025)
- Key people: James Graham (chairman); Leah Weckert (CEO, managing director)
- Products: Retail and consumer services
- Revenue: ▲ A$44.487 billion (2025)
- Operating income: ▲ A$2.0777 (2025)
- Net income: ▼ A$1.079 billion (2025)
- Total assets: ▲ A$20.294 (2025)
- Total equity: ▲ A$3.806 billion (2025)
- Number of employees: ▼115,000 (2025)
- Subsidiaries: Coles Supermarkets; Coles Online; Coles Liquor; Liquorland; Vintage Cellars; First Choice Liquor; Flybuys (50%); Coles Financial Services

Coles Group Limited is an Australian public company operating several retail chains. Its chief operations are primarily concerned with the sale of food and groceries through its flagship supermarket chain Coles Supermarkets, and the sale of liquor through its Coles Liquor outlets. Since its foundation in Collingwood, Victoria in 1914, Coles has grown to become the second-largest retailer in Australia after its principal rival, Woolworths Group, in terms of revenue.

Formerly known as Coles Myer Ltd. from 1986 to 2006, Coles Group was owned by Wesfarmers from 2007 until 2018, when it was spun-off, with it once again listed as an independent public company on the Australian Securities Exchange, containing Coles Supermarkets, Coles Online, Coles Express, Coles' liquor division, Coles' financial division, and Flybuys.

== History ==
=== G.J. Coles & Coy (1914–1986) ===
George Coles father married Ann Cameron "Annie" Topp of Buninyong on 20 August 1902 and sold his shop, measuring 20 by 18 feet (6.1 m × 5.5 m), in the Victorian country town of St James to eldest son George in 1910 for £4500, he then moved to Wilmot, Tasmania (around 30 km south of Ulverstone), where he opened yet another shop. G.J. Coles learnt his trade from his family's general store in Wilmot, Tasmania which his father owned between 1910 and 1921, the wooden heritage store continued but was destroyed by fire in 2014.

The Coles brand we know now was founded in 1914 by George Coles when he opened what was called the "Coles Variety Store" in Smith Street in the Melbourne suburb of Collingwood. More stores opened and the chain was regarded as the leaders in providing value to Australian shoppers. The building formerly occupied by the original Coles Variety Store is ironically now the location of a Woolworths supermarket – the major competitor to Coles.

Coles was run in succession by members of the Coles family from 1914 until the mid-1970s by the "famous five knights", brothers Sir George, Sir Arthur, Sir Edgar, Sir Kenneth and Sir Norman – known by their first initials – GJ, AW, EB, KF, NC.

Sir Edgar famously stated his ultimate goal was to stock everything a family might have on their weekly household shopping list. He recognised that combining variety goods with food would create unparalleled consumer convenience.

In 1959, right as Coles was beginning its pivot into food, the company sent Sir Thomas North to the United States for three months. His explicit mission was to study how American retailers designed, stocked, and operated their high-volume self-service supermarkets and upon his return to Australia, North directly implemented the US-inspired strategies he had studied.

In 1960, North was appointed as Coles' New South Wales State Manager. In this role, he worked alongside Managing Director Sir Edgar to execute massive interstate grocery acquisitions. Most notably, he helped lead the corporate takeover of the Matthews Thompson grocery chain in NSW. This acquisition instantly gave Coles hundreds of new retail properties to convert into food supermarkets, securing their footprint against Woolworths.

In 1960, the first supermarket was opened in the Melbourne suburb of Balwyn North and in 1973, a Coles store had been established in all capital cities of the country. In 1975, Sir Thomas North was appointed the first Managing Director of Coles who was not a member of the Coles family.

Kmart Australia Limited was born out of a joint venture between G.J. Coles & Coy (Coles) and S.S. Kresge (later Kmart Corporation) in the US. The first store opened in the Melbourne suburb of Burwood in 1969. In 1978, Kresge (Kmart) exchanged its 51% stake in Kmart Australia for a 20% stake in G.J. Coles & Coy Coles, allowing Coles to fully acquire Kmart Australia.

=== Coles Myer (1986–2006) ===
Coles Group was previously known as Coles Myer (1986–2006)

By the 1980s, Coles primarily operated supermarkets, whilst Myer operated the department store chains Myer and Grace Bros, as well as the Target discount variety store chain in Australia, and fast food restaurant chain Red Rooster (which it acquired in 1981). Both Coles and Myer grew throughout Australia through growth and acquisitions, and both independently listed on the Australian Securities Exchange. In August 1985, the Myer Emporium Ltd and GJ Coles & Coy Ltd merged, becoming the largest ever Australian Corporation. The official name change to "Coles Myer Limited" followed in January 1986. The U.S. Kmart Corporation continued to hold shareholding in the merged company until Kmart sold its 21.5% stake in November 1994.

A new head office opened in 1987 at Hawthorn East, Melbourne. As of 2022, it remained the head office for Coles Group and associated subsidiaries.

In September 1993, Coles Myer signed a licence agreement with Brinker International for the Chili's Texas Grill restaurant chain. It opened the first Chili's restaurant in August 1994 in Sydney with plans to open up to 50 locations across Australia. A second Chili's opened in February 1995. Five months later, despite the success of the restaurants, Coles Myer decided to cancel the roll-out to focus on its core businesses. It sold the Chili's licence and two existing restaurants to Red Hot Concepts in late 1995.

The merger of Myer Emporium Ltd had included the Fosseys variety discount chain. The previously competing brands of Fosseys and Coles Variety Stores became an integrated entity soon after the merge, but by 1994, they were still using the Fosseys brand for country stores and Coles Variety stores in city/suburban areas. Soon after, the Coles Variety Store brand was retired, and all stores converted or closed.

Bi-Lo was acquired by Coles Myer in 1987. It was a major supermarket chain and continued to be owned and operated by Coles Myer in parallel to Coles Supermarkets. Bi-Lo was rebranded to Coles from 2007, the last store rebranded in 2017.

The office stationery chain Officeworks, based on the US chain Office Depot, was established in 1993 with the first store opening in the Melbourne suburb of Richmond in June 1994. This represented a successful introduction of a "category killer" – by comparison, around the same time Coles unsuccessfully attempted to negate the arrival of Toys "R" Us with the short-lived chain World 4 Kids.

In 1996, the operations of Target and Fosseys (earlier "Coles-Fossey") merged and the first Baby Target speciality store was opened, followed in 1998 by Target Home. In 1999, regional Fosseys stores were re-badged as Target Country, with metropolitan stores closed. Following Target's operating loss of $43m in 2001, the chain's format was repositioned to compete less with Kmart, Woolworths, Big W, Harris Scarfe and The Warehouse, and more with Myer, with a focus on "middle class" quality products, especially clothing and home wares.

In 1998, Coles Myer opened the first Megamart store, a furniture and electrical goods retailer. Harris Technology, a computer hardware and software reseller started by Ron Harris in 1986, was acquired in 1999.

By 2001, there were three Megamart stores and Coles Myer planned to expand the chain, but by 2005 had decided to divest the struggling business. Six of the nine stores were sold to competitor Harvey Norman, with the remainder closed.

In 2001, the company appointed John Fletcher, formerly of Brambles, as chief executive. Fletcher engineered a brief turnaround in the company's fortunes. Fletcher abolished the shareholder discount card, on the basis that it had eroded margins while providing little benefit, and was unpopular with institutional investors. Since their introduction in the early 1990s, the card had induced a tenfold increase in the number of Coles Myer's shareholders, with the overwhelming majority owning only small parcels of shares.

Fletcher also engineered the acquisition of the retail fuel operations of Shell Australia with the fuel outlets rebranded as Coles Express, allowing Coles Group to counter the success of Woolworths' discount petrol operation. Woolworths subsequently gained entry to part of Caltex Australia's network to provide a recognised brand for its fuel offer.

In 2002, Coles Myer sold Red Rooster to Western Australian company Australian Fast Foods.

=== Coles Group (2006–2007) ===
On 17 August 2005, Coles Myer announced that within 12 months, it would decide to demerge, divest or retain Myer. Thirteen expressions of interest were made for all or part of Myer. On 13 March 2006, Coles Myer announced it would sell Myer to a consortium controlled by US private equity group Newbridge Capital. The consortium also included the Myer family, who held a 5% stake. The sale was completed for A$1.4 bn on 2 June 2006. Coles Myer changed its name to "Coles Group Limited" in November 2006. Coles Group Limited also changed its listed code on the Australian Securities Exchange from CML to CGJ, which references back to its first ever registered company name of G.J. Coles & Coy Proprietary Limited. The company has in the past been listed on the NYSE (de-listed 6 January 2006), the New Zealand Stock Exchange (de-listed 1989) and the London Stock Exchange.

In April 2006, Coles Myer acquired Pharmacy Direct for $48 million, controversially using Pharmacy Direct's corporate license to skirt laws restricting ownership of pharmacies to qualified pharmacists. The Pharmacy Guild of Australia brought a case against Coles to the New South Wales Supreme Court. In September 2008, the Court ordered Coles to sell the business, which it did in early 2009.

In August 2006, Coles announced that a group of private equity companies led by Kohlberg Kravis Roberts & Co. (KKR) was looking to buy the company, with an initial proposal of $14.50 per share. The Coles board rejected the offer stating it significantly undervalued the company, and was conditional on a due diligence process, without a guarantee that the deal would go ahead. A second proposal of $15.25 per share in October 2006 was rejected for largely the same reasons.

In November 2006, long-term senior supermarkets executive Peter Scott was dismissed for an unspecified breach of the company's code of conduct.

On 23 February 2007, the company announced a downgrade of expected earnings and that it was considering ownership options, including the possibility of a full sale of the business or restructuring such as a demerger. On 20 March 2007, it deferred its plans to rebrand Kmart under the Coles banner and create supercentres, and subsequently paused its conversion of Bi-Lo stores to Coles Supermarkets given the lack of success of this move.

On 23 March, Coles Group stated it planned to sell its businesses as either an entire package, or in three parts (Officeworks, Target and the remaining businesses Kmart, Coles, Bi-Lo, Liquorland, Vintage Cellars and First Choice Liquor).

On 3 April, Solomon Lew, the former chairman and long-time antagonist of the current board and management team, sold his 5.8% shareholding of the company. A large portion of these shares were bought by Wesfarmers, which was believed to be part of a consortium of bidders including Macquarie Bank, PEP and Permira. The share price at which the transaction took place was reportedly $16.47, then 2.2% above the market price. A bid for the entire company at this price would have valued Coles Group at A$19.7 billion, well above the two KKR proposals announced in 2006.

In May 2007, Coles reported its slowest sales growth in at least seven years with continuing poor performance from Coles Supermarkets and Kmart.

=== Acquisition by Wesfarmers (2007) ===
In July 2007, Wesfarmers announced it intended to buy Coles Group for $22 billion, the largest take-over bid in Australia. The sale was expected to be completed in October 2007.

In August 2007, Wesfarmers foreshadowed its plans for the restructuring of Coles Group following its anticipated takeover, including investment of A$5 billion, establishing three separate divisions (including a combined Bunnings/Officeworks "big box" retailing division), the possible sale of Kmart, and the exit of Coles Group from its head office base at Tooronga.

The independent expert report published in October 2007, advising shareholders preparatory to the proposed sale was critical of the culture within Coles Group.

At a shareholder meeting in Melbourne on 7 November 2007, shareholders voted overwhelmingly with 99.25% approval of the sale of Coles Group to Wesfarmers. The Scheme of Arrangement between Coles Group and its shareholders was approved by the Supreme Court of Victoria on 9 November 2007, the last day Coles Group shares traded on the Australian Securities Exchange. The Scheme was implemented on 23 November 2007, ending Coles Group as a company with its subsidiaries merged into Wesfarmers' business structure.

=== Spin-off (2018–present) ===
In November 2018, Coles Group Limited was spun-off from Wesfarmers on 21 November 2018, with the company once again listed as a public company on the Australian Securities Exchange under the trading code COL, debuting at A$12.49. At the time of listing, the company included 806 Coles Supermarkets, 712 Coles Express outlets, 894 liquor stores including Liquorland, Vintage Cellars and First Choice Liquor, Coles-branded financial services and 88 Spirit Hotels, as well as joint-ownership of the flybuys loyalty program. Subsidiaries of the previous Coles Group such as Kmart, Target and Officeworks remain as subsidiaries of Wesfarmers.

In March 2019, Coles and Australian Venue Co. established a joint venture (Queensland Venue Co) where AVC would take over operations of the Coles' Spirit Hotels and receive its profits while Coles would run the group's liquor stores and receive its profits. Coles received $200 million from AVC as part of the deal. In May 2020, Coles completed the acquisition of Jewel Fine Foods, one of its suppliers of ready-to-eat meals, after the company went into administration in April 2019.

In September 2022, Coles announced that it would sell its Coles Express stations to Viva Energy for $300 million. The deal was completed in May 2023.

In April 2023, Coles announced its intention to purchase two milk processing plants from Saputo Inc. for $105 million. In February 2024, Coles Liquor reached an agreement to acquire 20 9/11 liquor stores in Tasmania from Federal Group. In April 2024, Coles Group launched Swaggle, an online retailer of pet care goods and pet insurance. Swaggle was shut down in April 2026.

== Operations ==
=== Current store formats ===
- Supermarkets & Customer Fulfilment
  - Coles Supermarkets: the second largest supermarket chain in Australia.
  - Coles Local: Small-format grocery stores.
  - Coles Online: Online retail site
- Liquor
  - Liquorland: Liquor chain, with some outlets attached to Coles Supermarkets, but run separately. Larger format First Choice Liquor stores have since been combined into the Liquorland brand. .
  - Vintage Cellars: Liquor chain with an orientation towards fine wines and premium liquor.
- Distribution & Retail Manufacturing
  - Chef Fresh: Food manufacturer Chef Fresh Pty Ltd, acquired chilled food producer Jewel Fine Foods Pty Ltd.
- Joint Ventures
  - flybuys: loyalty program, 50% owned by Coles Group.
  - Queensland Venue Co: 50% owned by Coles Group.

=== Defunct store formats ===
- Consumer Electronics Retail
  - Harris Technology: Computer hardware and software reseller with a strong online presence, oriented towards corporate customers.
- Convenience Stores
  - Coles Express: rebranded Shell convenience stores at Shell service stations offering retail and fuel products. Before Coles Myer Ltd took over Shell service stations, Coles Express was the name used for smaller, inner-urban Coles supermarkets which are now known as Coles Central. In May 2023, Coles sold its Coles express stations to Viva Energy, the retailer of Shell in Australia.
- Hypermarkets
  - Coles SuperCentres: planned to open from September 2007, with many sourced from either existing Pick 'n Pay Hypermarkets or former 'Super K' stores, which were divided in the 1990s into separate Coles and Kmart stores. However these plans were put on hold in March 2007 pending the sale of Coles Group. Then in August 2007, Wesfarmers CEO Richard Goyder said super centres would almost certainly not be part of the Wesfarmers approach after taking over Coles Group.
  - Pick 'n Pay Hypermarket: two "hypermarkets" located in suburbs of Brisbane. (Rebranded to Coles and Kmart in late 2012)
- Liquor
  - First Choice Liquor: First Choice Liquor stores have been combined into the Liquorland brand. The First Choice Liquor chain consisted of larger stores which competed more directly with Dan Murphy's. These larger stores have since been updated with Liquorland branding. Had previously been two separate large-format stores, the more middle-market First Choice Liquor and the no frills Liquor Mart.
  - The no frills Liquor Mart: Liquor Market merged into First Choice, with some stores retaining the lower cost product line up and yellow branding.
- Supermarkets
  - Bi-Lo: a discount supermarket chain. Until 2001, Bi-Lo traded as Newmart in Western Australia. In August 2006 Coles Group began to re-brand BI-LO stores as Coles Supermarket or divested them, but this activity was placed on hold in 2007 pending the sale of Coles Group until 2017.
