= Reddy Express =

Australian convenience store chain owned by Viva Energy (2003-present)

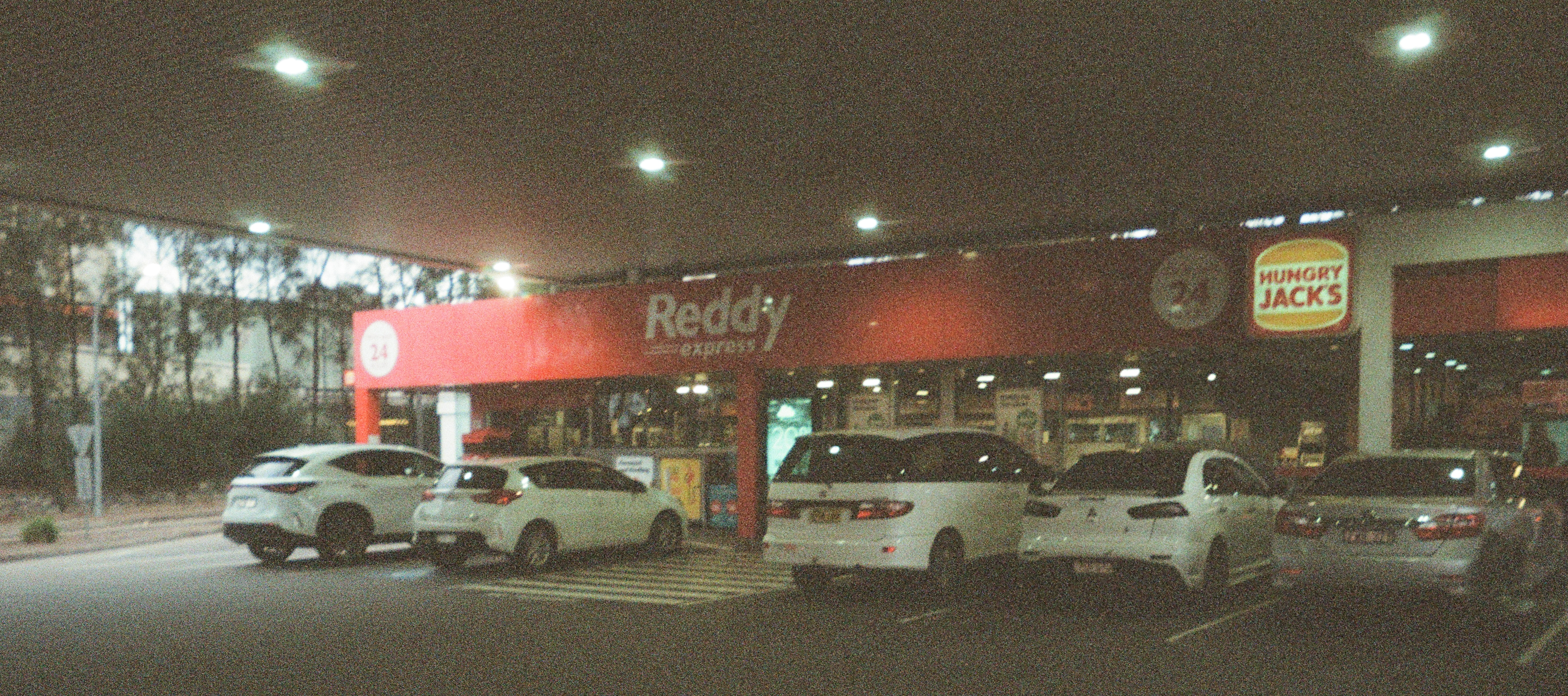
- Reddy Express with a Hungry Jack's franchise in Greenacre, New South Wales
- Trade name: Reddy Express; Coles Express (currently phasing out)
- Type: Subsidiary
- Industry: Automotive and retail
- Founded: 28 July 2003; 23 years ago
- Headquarters: Hawthorn East, Melbourne, Australia
- Number of locations: 723 (2022)
- Key people: Jevan Bouz (CEO)
- Products: Petrol, convenience and grocery
- Revenue: $1.1 billion (2022)
- Net income: $42 million (2022)
- Number of employees: 4,800 (2022)
- Parent: Coles Myer (2003–2007); Wesfarmers (2007–2018); Coles Group (2018–2023); Viva Energy (2023–present)
- Website: reddyexpress.com.au

Reddy Express is an Australian chain of convenience stores at Shell Australia petrol stations. Formerly a subsidiary of Coles Group, it came under the ownership of Viva Energy in May 2023. Under its previous ownership structure, Coles Express was the former name and an alternate trading name of Coles Group. In September 2023, Coles Express was rebranded as Reddy Express.

The business venture and corresponding fuel discount offer was launched by Coles Myer (predecessor of Coles Group) on 28 July 2003 in response to a similar offer by rival Woolworths some years earlier, which proved attractive to shoppers. Coles Myer purchased the retail business of Shell Australia's multi-site franchisees for $94 million. Shell Australia (later also sold to Viva Energy) continues to be the exclusive supplier of fuel products; leasing the service station property to Coles, and maintaining the presence of the "pecten" and other Shell branding on the price boards and other signage. The reasoning behind the term “Reddy”, which is a stylised version of the word "ready", is due to the stores' convenience-based nature.

== History ==
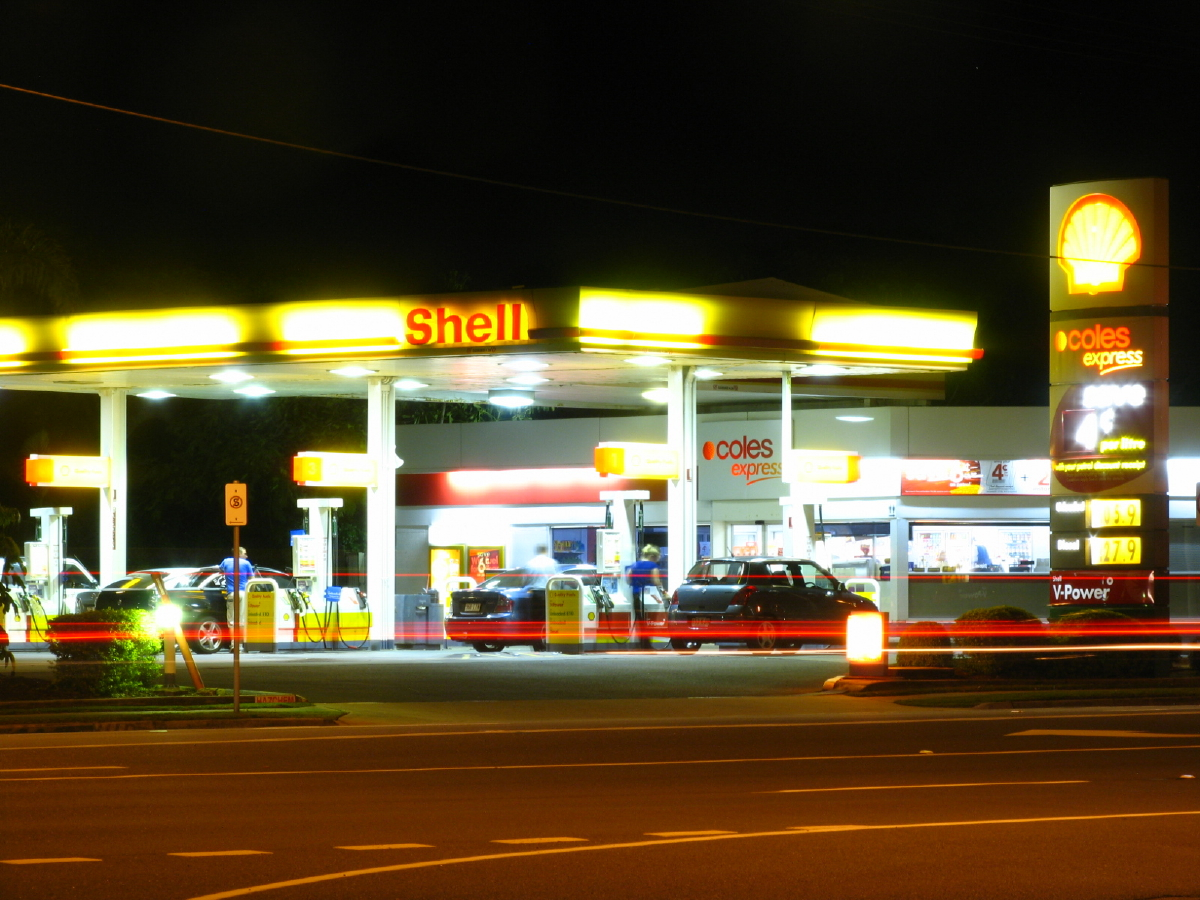
Coles Express on Hornibrook Esplanade, Clontarf, Queensland

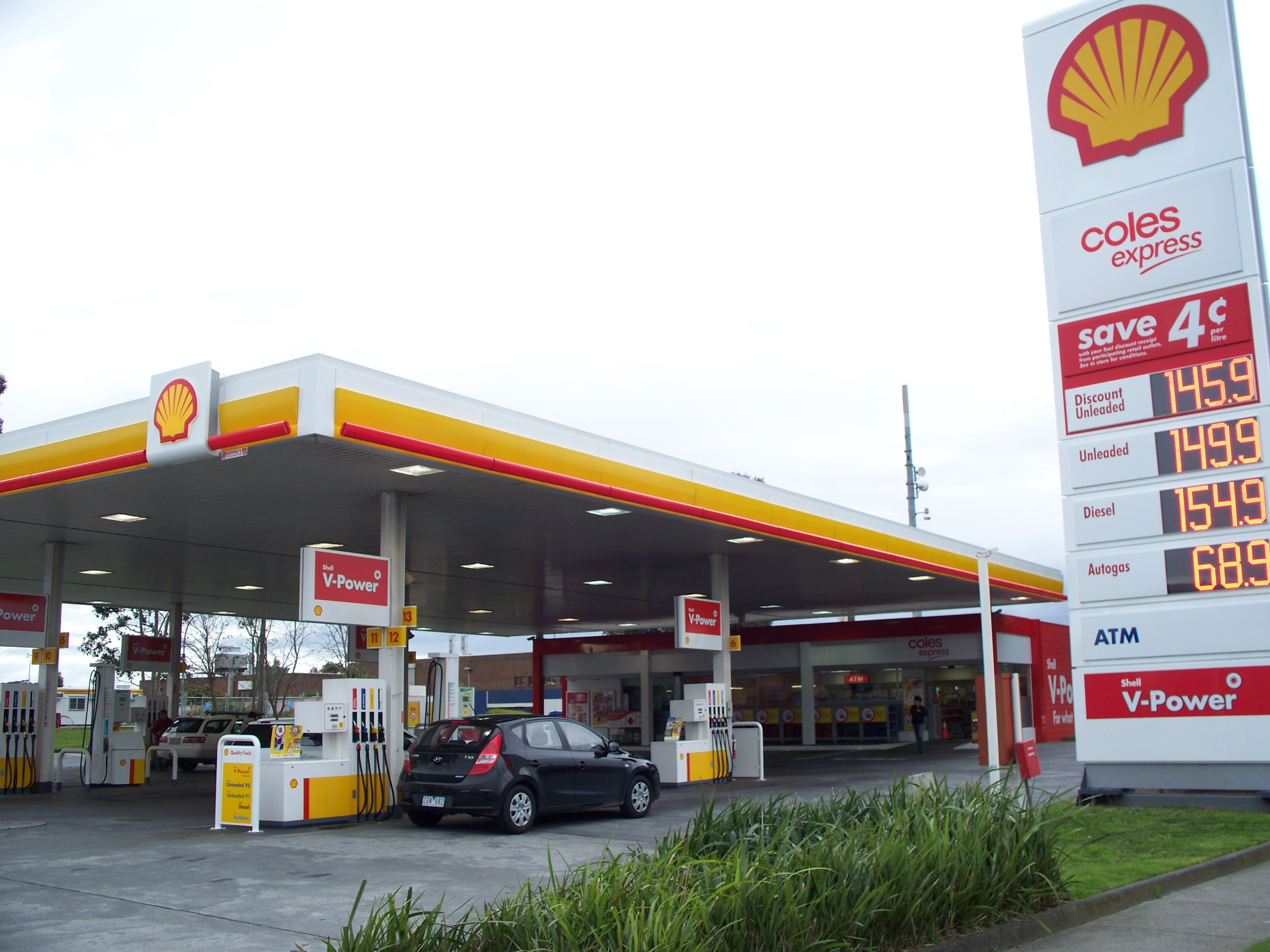
Coles Express on Burwood Highway, Vermont South, Victoria

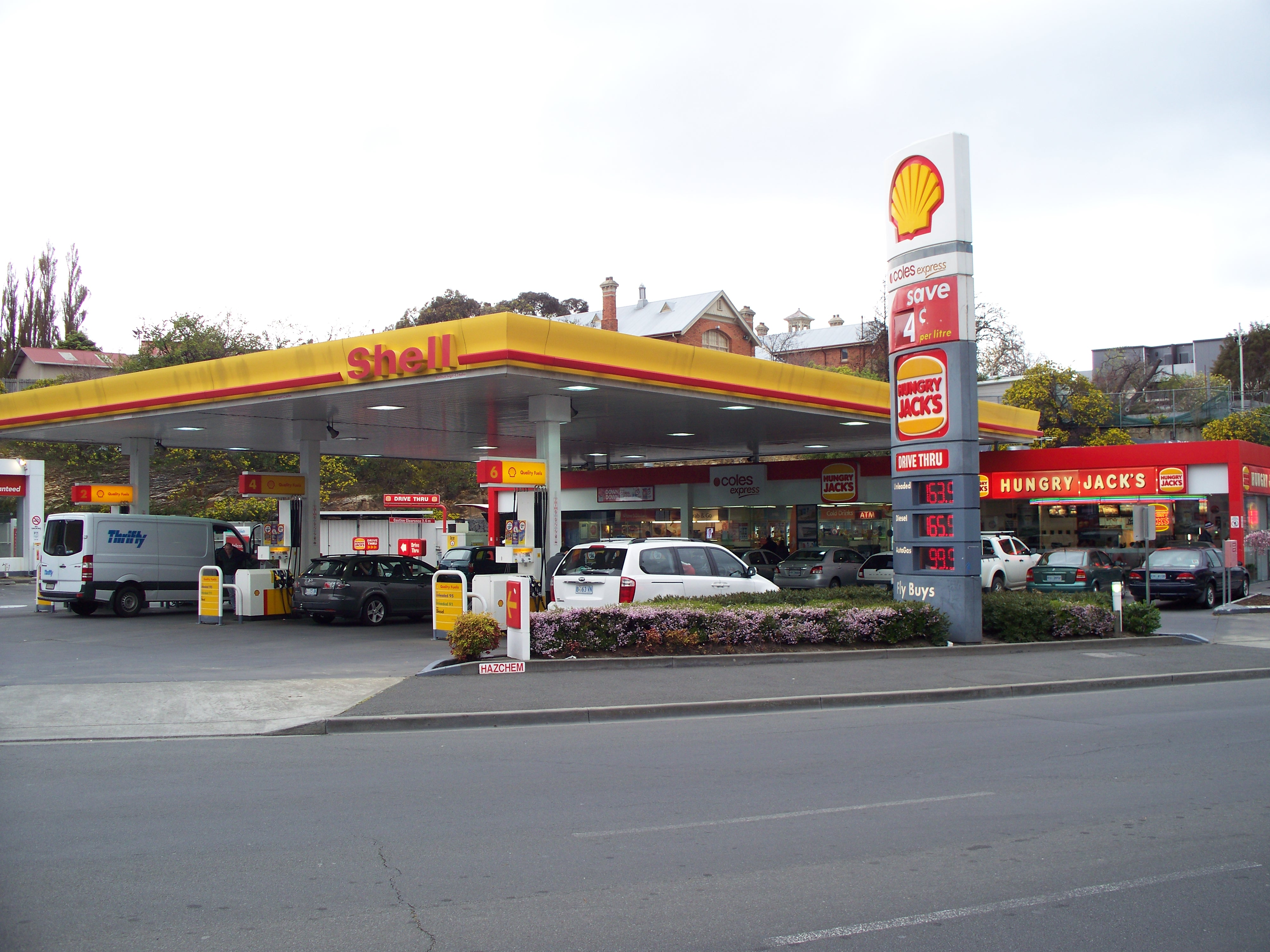
Coles Express/Hungry Jack's on Elizabeth Street, Hobart

The Coles Express brand originally referred to a small number of medium-sized supermarkets Coles ran in the central business districts of Melbourne, Sydney, and Brisbane. With the launch of Coles' fuel offer, these were rebranded as Coles Central with the service stations taking the Coles Express branding.

The Coles Express chain began at more than 150 service stations in Victoria on 28 July 2003. After this initial trial, it was followed by a national roll-out from 1 December the same year, starting with New South Wales, and completed in mid-2004. The initial success of the discount offer saw fuel shortages in Victoria after the offer began in New South Wales – where Shell's busiest sites are located – as Shell failed to cope with the distribution of a 30 percent increase in demand.

On 20 February 2006, 90 vehicle servicing bays at Coles Express service stations (formerly part of Shell's Autoserv and AutoCare network) became Kmart Tyre & Auto Service outlets.

=== Coles and Viva Energy alliance ===
On 6 February 2019 Coles Express announced a new alliance partnership with their fuel partner Viva Energy which is licensed to retail Shell-branded fuels across Australia under a licence agreement. Under the agreement Viva Energy is responsible for setting the price of fuel and receives the retail fuel margin. Coles Express receives a commission per litre from Viva Energy based on fuel volumes achieved and has no direct exposure to retail fuel price movements.

In addition to setting fuel pricing Viva Energy is the exclusive supplier of fuel, oil and lubricants. Viva also maintains it pecten and Shell branding as well as all fuel dispensing equipment. Coles Express is responsible for the maintenance of the retail store (including in-store pricing) and the everyday needs of the business.

As of July 2021, there were 723 Coles Express service stations and stand-alone convenience sites across Australia. All former Shell multi-site franchisee sites became Coles Express stores. This transition included the petrol stations and stand-alone Shell Select convenience stores in Melbourne's CBD (which closed by December 2006).

=== Sale to Viva Energy ===
In September 2022 Coles Group announced it had agreed terms with Viva Energy to sell the Coles Express retail business. As part of the deal Flybuys will remain a partner and Coles will continue stocking its own-branded products. The acquisition was completed on 1 May 2023. During 2023 Viva Energy entered into an agreement with the owners of more than 200 OTR-branded petrol stations to acquire the fuel and convenience store marketing rights at all OTR-branded outlets in South Australia and elsewhere. As part of Viva's acquisition of the OTR-branded retail sites of Peregrine Corporation, Viva was required to divest 25 of its Coles Express convenience stores in South Australia. Viva divested those stores to Chevron, and in February 2024, the sites were rebranded as Caltex. The acquisition was approved by the ACCC during 2024, following which the acquisition was completed in March 2024.

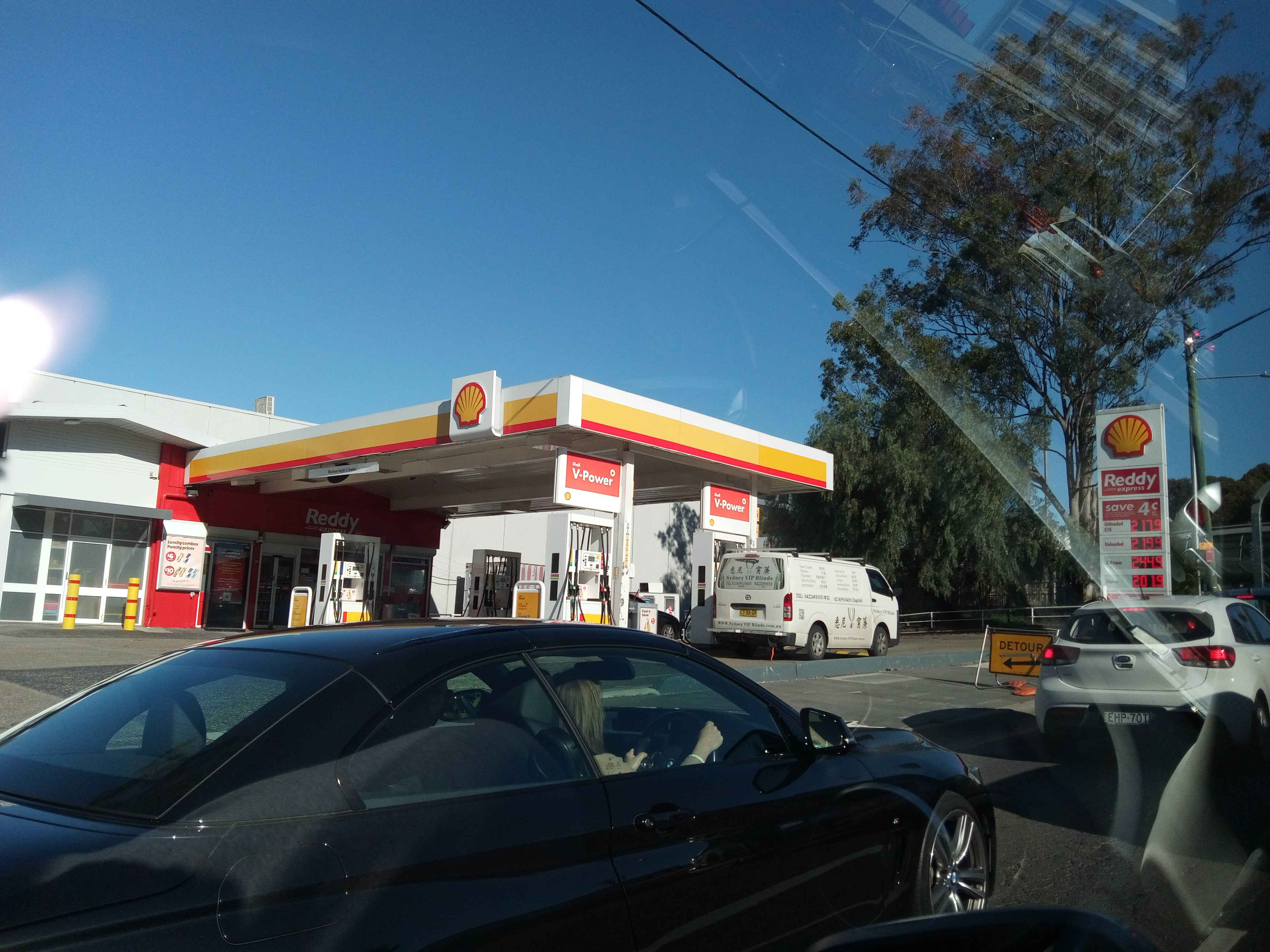
Reddy Express Service Station in North Ryde (2024)

Following Viva Energy announcing its purchase of the OTR service station chain from Peregrine Corporation in South Australia, Viva decided to retire the Coles Express brand and rebrand all stores as OTR. Due to delays with regulatory approval for the OTR acquisition, Viva announced in September 2023 that it would start transitioning Coles Express stations to a new brand, Reddy Express. Other stores would be converted to OTR beginning in 2024. Meanwhile, Reddy Express launched a few months in late 2023. Only months after the announcement. Those Reddy Express stations may be converted to OTR upon approval of the acquisition, with Viva planning for OTR to be its leading brand in South Australia. Also, Viva Energy has indicated that it plans to retain the OTR brand and expand it, particularly in markets outside South Australia. Viva Energy has noted via its public announcements that the OTR app adds significant value to the acquisition. Viva Energy is currently in the process of removing BP and independent OTR branding from OTR fuel outlets and replacing BP and independent OTR fuel branding with the Shell fuel branding. While newly branded Reddy Express outlets continue to provide Flybuys benefits, Flybuys benefits are not currently offered at OTR outlets and Viva Energy intentions on this front are unclear.

In April 2024, Reddy Express rebrands began in Queensland and New South Wales. As of May 2024 they have rebranded sites in Queensland, New South Wales, Victoria & Western Australia. As of August 2024, more than 100 stores have been rebranded. In October 2024, South Australia had begun its first rebrands from Coles Express to Reddy Express.

In late 2024, Viva Energy commenced rebranding the fuel offer at its OTR outlets in South Australia and across Australia by replacing the old BP signage and independent OTR signage with the Shell signage. In December 2024, the first Coles Express sites changed to OTR sites including three in Sydney and one in Adelaide. In May 2025, the first rebranded Reddy Express sites changed to OTR.

== Fuel discount offer ==
=== Fuel discount offers ===
When a customer spends over a qualifying amount in one transaction at Coles Supermarkets, Coles Central, or Coles Online, they are entitled to a fuel discount of 4c per litre or 8 bonus Flybuys points per litre at Reddy Express. This discount is obtained by providing a discount voucher, either on the Flybuys card or printed at the bottom of their receipt, and includes all Shell fuels. Reddy Express also offers a 10c per litre discount on all Shell fuels when a customer spends $20 or more on qualifying products in store, this can be used in addition to the 4c per litre discount voucher.

Additionally, there is a bonus 4c discount that can be obtained in conjunction with the above discounts by scanning a barcode in certain apps, such as the Shell V-Power Racing Team app and apps that require an account with certain companies such as the Budget Direct Fuel Discounts app, Linkt and G'day Rewards.

=== Previous fuel discount offerings ===
An additional bonus discount was introduced in late 2006, with a further 2c per litre fuel discount when customers spent $2 in-store in the one transaction. The offer was made permanent in April 2007 after rival Caltex Woolworths created a similar offer of an additional 4c discount if customers spend $5 in the one transaction at their petrol stations. The 2c per litre finished on 1 February 2013. Coles Express now offers a "Spend $20 and Save 10 cents per litre" this was launched to an "Everyday" offer in late 2015 and has continued since, variations of this deal are offered occasionally e.g. Buy product X for X dollars and save X cents per litre.

Other variations of the fuel offer have been offered from time to time including:

- In the lead-up to Christmas 2006, the 4c offer increased to 10c for customers spending $80 and over in one transaction at Coles Supermarkets; this offer was extended for a further short time in attempt to boost Coles' sales figures.
- Liquorland has offered a 20c-per-litre discount offer when customers purchase six bottles of wine in one transaction.
- Kmart Tyre & Auto Service has offered a 30c-per-litre discount offer when customers purchased four certain tyres in one transaction.
