= Flybuys (Australia) =

Australian customer loyalty program jointly owned by Coles Group and Wesfarmers

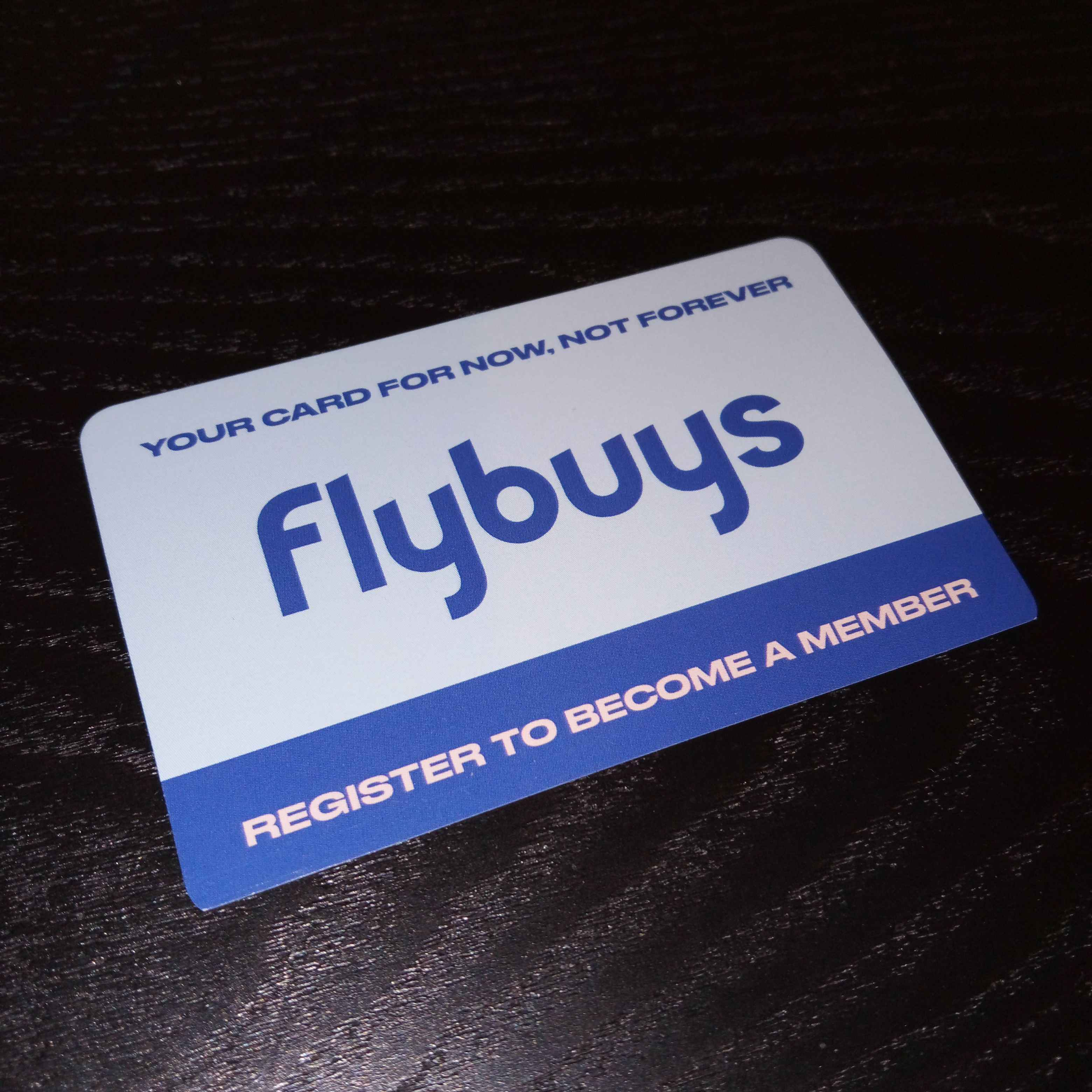
- A trial card for Flybuys, commonly seen at checkouts
- Type: Loyalty program
- Run by: Loyalty Pacific
- Owner: Coles Group (50%); Wesfarmers (50%)
- Area served: Australia
- Introduced: 1994; 32 years ago
- Number of users: 9 million
- Accrual partners: Coles Supermarkets; Coles Express; Liquorland; Target; Kmart; mycar Tyre and Auto; Bunnings; Officeworks; catch.com.au; ... and others
- Tagline: More places. More rewards.
- Website: flybuys.com.au

Flybuys is an Australian customer loyalty program equally owned by the Coles Group and Wesfarmers through joint venture Loyalty Pacific. Members can accrue points by shopping at Coles Group brands (Coles Supermarkets, Liquorland, etc.), certain Wesfarmers brands (Kmart, Target, Bunnings, Officeworks, Kleenheat, etc.), and some third-party partners like HCF Insurance, Reddy Express and Optus. Points can then be redeemed for money off purchases at Coles Supermarkets, Coles Express, Liquorland, Kmart, Officeworks, Target and mycar (2,000 points gives an A$10 discount), as well as holidays (through Flybuys Travel or Velocity Frequent Flyer) and household goods (from the Flybuys Rewards Store).

It is one of Australia's largest loyalty programs and has over nine million members. Fifteen Flybuys cards are scanned every second on average in Australia.

== History ==
Flybuys began in 1994 as a joint venture of Shell, Coles Myer and National Australia Bank. The program met with substantial interest at launch, with a million Australian households joining within the first six weeks.

Telstra joined the program in 1995 but withdrew after two years, having created the Telstra Visa Card with the ANZ Bank (later to become the ANZ Qantas Telstra Visa Card). In April 2012, Telstra rejoined Flybuys with points being offered for pre-paid services.

In 1996, Loyalty Pacific licensed the brand to a consortium in New Zealand, which began to operate a similar program, also called Flybuys.

In 1998, major changes were made to the program. The offer to members was diluted because the points currency was devalued to increase points required for rewards 20-fold (from a minimum 550 points to 11,000), but the issuing of standard points only increased fourfold (from 1 point for $20 to 1 point for $5). At the same time, Shell relinquished its one-third ownership of the program, although that was unnoticed by members as Shell continued to issue points through its company-owned service station network.

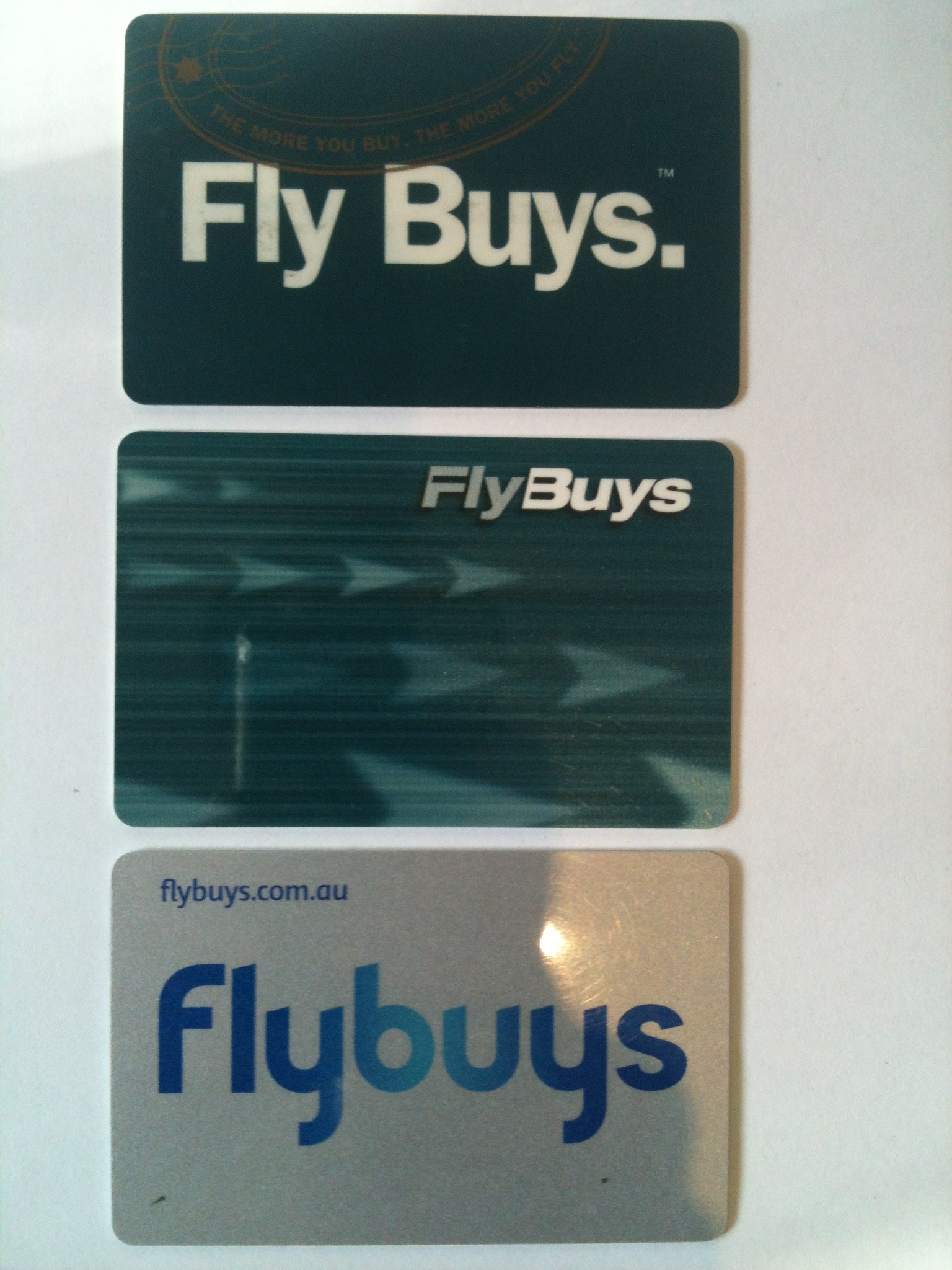
The three generations of flybuys cards. Top: 1994–2003. Middle: 2003–2012. Bottom: 2012–unknown

In 2003, the program was revamped, with the offer improved for members, with the issuing of standard points at participating Coles Group brands increased to 2 points for $5. That change was accompanied by revised branding and a minor name change from “Fly Buys” to “FlyBuys”.

In December 2006, Loyalty Pacific was cited as a potential purchaser of the Qantas Frequent Flyer program.

In February 2011, Coles acquired National Australia Bank's 50 per cent interest in Flybuys, with NAB remaining as a major participant in the program.

In April 2012, Coles announced a substantial relaunch of the program, with the issuing of points for major brands increasing to 1 point for $1, and AGL, Telstra and Webjet became new partners. Points no longer expired if members used their card or redeemed points at least once a year. New cards were sent to over 8 million households in Australia. At the same time, a new benefit was introduced, under which Flybuys members could obtain a 10% discount off five product categories of their choice.

A consumer study of Australian loyalty programs in 2013 showed that Flybuys was easily the most popular program in Australia.

In April 2018, Wesfarmers stated it would be demerging the Coles business, but it retained a substantial ownership stake in Flybuys.

In November 2018, Wesfarmers and Coles announced the appointment of John Merakovsky as chief executive officer of Flybuys.

In February 2022, following the resignation of John Merakovsky, Wesfarmers and Coles announced the appointment of Anna Lee as chief executive officer of Flybuys.

== Collecting points ==
Flybuys points collection is directed largely at regular consumer purchases, and most points are issued by major Coles and Wesfarmers brands – food (Coles Supermarkets, Coles Local), fuel (Shell Reddy Express (formerly Coles Express), Shell OTR), discount department stores (Kmart, K Hub, Target and catch.com.au), automotive (mycar Tyre and Auto) and liquor (Liquorland and First Choice Liquor). Coles also offers points for members who take up Coles car, home or pet insurance. Other brands which participate, but are not associated with the owners of Flybuys, include Optus and HCF Insurance.

Additional points can be collected from transactions on the Coles MasterCard (issued by Citibank) or selected National Australia Bank (NAB) credit cards, if they have been "linked" to a Flybuys membership. In some circumstances, that allows for one transaction to gain points from two sources: e.g. if a member pays for grocery purchases at Coles Supermarkets with a NAB credit card, Coles and NAB would issue points for the one transaction.

In October 2012, Flybuys created the Flybuys Toolbar in conjunction with Yahoo!7, enabling members to collect points from their web searches.

In July 2013, Australia's largest health insurer Medibank joined Flybuys, but left in 2019.

In November 2021, it was announced that Bunnings would be joining the program for the first time, and that Officeworks would be re-joining.

Former participants in Flybuys include Myer (which withdrew in 2007 after being sold by Coles Group in June 2006), EziBuy (which purchased a former Coles Myer brand, Myer Direct), Michael Hill Jeweller, Elders Real Estate and Curves. Others such as Red Rooster and Katies were businesses divested by then Coles Myer. Traveland, Pulse Energy and Solar Shop are now-defunct businesses which were once Flybuys participants, while Megamart, Bi-Lo, Bi-Lo Mega Fresh, Coles Express, Kmart Tyre & Auto Service (now Mycar), Target Country, Baby Target, Target Home, Fosseys, Grace Bros, Newmart, Sports Direct, Primary Layers, South Cape and Gifts To Go were Coles Myer/Coles Group brands that have been discontinued. Officeworks (though also owned by Wesfarmers and has since rejoined in early December, 2021) and Harris Technology withdrew in 2009.

For in-store purchases, the barcode on the back of a Flybuys card must be scanned to earn points. Alternatively, the barcode can also be stored on the Coles App, Apple Wallet or Google Wallet. For online purchases, the 16 digit member number on the back of the card is entered instead. In most cases points accrue at the rate of 1 for every $1 spent. Periodically, Flybuys will issue offers for additional points, which must be activated before use online or via the Flybuys app. Usually these offers offer either a higher earn rate (e.g. 10x points) or a certain number of points for completing a purchase of above a certain amount at a retailer. Most offers are targeted based on the member's transaction history.

== Redemption of points ==
Initially, Flybuys points could only be redeemed for flights. In 1996, that was extended to include other benefits with a travel or leisure theme, such as accommodation, meals and entertainment. In 1999, redemption with a $100 Coles Myer shopping voucher was introduced, and general merchandise items followed. In 2009, most redemptions were gift cards or credits to credit card balances, with only a small proportion of redemptions being for flights. According to Flybuys, as of 2010, over ten million rewards had been redeemed by members and there were over 800 choices. In 2012, "Flybuys Dollars" was introduced, allowing members to redeem points when paying for purchases at Coles, Kmart, Target, Liquorland, First Choice Liquor and Coles Express.

There are currently 5 main ways to redeem points on the Flybuys app or website:

- Store Credit at Coles Group stores: Points can be redeemed for money off a shop at some Coles Group stores, at the rate of 200 points to $1. There are two ways to do this:
  - Flybuys Dollars: Points can be redeemed for Flybuys Dollars in 2000 point (equivalent to $10) increments on the Flybuys app or website. Flybuys Dollars can then be spent in-store using the mag-stripe on the Flybuys card like any other payment card and entering the PIN set at time of redemption.
  - Instant $10 off: Once a Flybuys barcode has been scanned at a checkout, if the total is above $10 and the account has more than 2000 points, the member will be prompted if they want to redeem an instant $10 off. As a PIN is not required this way, this can only be redeemed once a day. This feature was progressively rolled out to most Coles stores in 2023 and was expanded to Target with a new $20 option in 2024.
- Gift Cards: Points can be redeemed for both Coles Group and third party gift cards, usually at the same rate as for store credit, however there are occasional promotions for a lower rate. Most cards are physical and will be posted to the member's address.
- Rewards Store: Points can be redeemed for various items like homewares and electronics.
- Flybuys Travel: Points can be redeemed for flights, hotels and package tours.
- Velocity Frequent Flyer: Points can be converted to Velocity Frequent Flyer Points in increments of 1000 Flybuys to 500 Velocity. Auto transfers can also be set up.

== Unpacked by Flybuys ==
On 29 September 2020, Flybuys launched its data platform, Unpacked by Flybuys.

== Criticism ==
Flybuys has been criticised regarding the effort required to collect enough points to gain a reward. For many years, no rewards were available for fewer than 11,000 points, leading critics to claim that $55,000 was required to be spent to gain a reward with a value of around $100. However, since 2006, rewards have been available from 2,500 points, and it is now as low as 1,200 points (streaming new release movies).

Flybuys also attracted concerns regarding privacy of information, and the ability for the operators to track members’ shopping habits. In 1994, Flybuys adopted a privacy policy based on OECD principles under which it advised members that it might use personal information, such as name, age, gender, employment status and age of family members, "for marketing, planning, product development, research, Flybuys account administration and fraud and crime prevention and investigation." Flybuys varied this policy in 2006 to enable information to be passed to Coles Group and National Australia Bank, the owners of the program, unless directed otherwise by members. In 2009, Flybuys' responsible privacy practices were recognised with the conferring of an Australian Privacy Award.

== See also ==
- Flybuys (New Zealand)
- Everyday Rewards, the loyalty program run by the competing Woolworths Group
