= Coles Supermarkets =

Australian supermarket chain owned by Coles Group

Coles Supermarkets Australia Pty Ltd
- Logo used since 2007

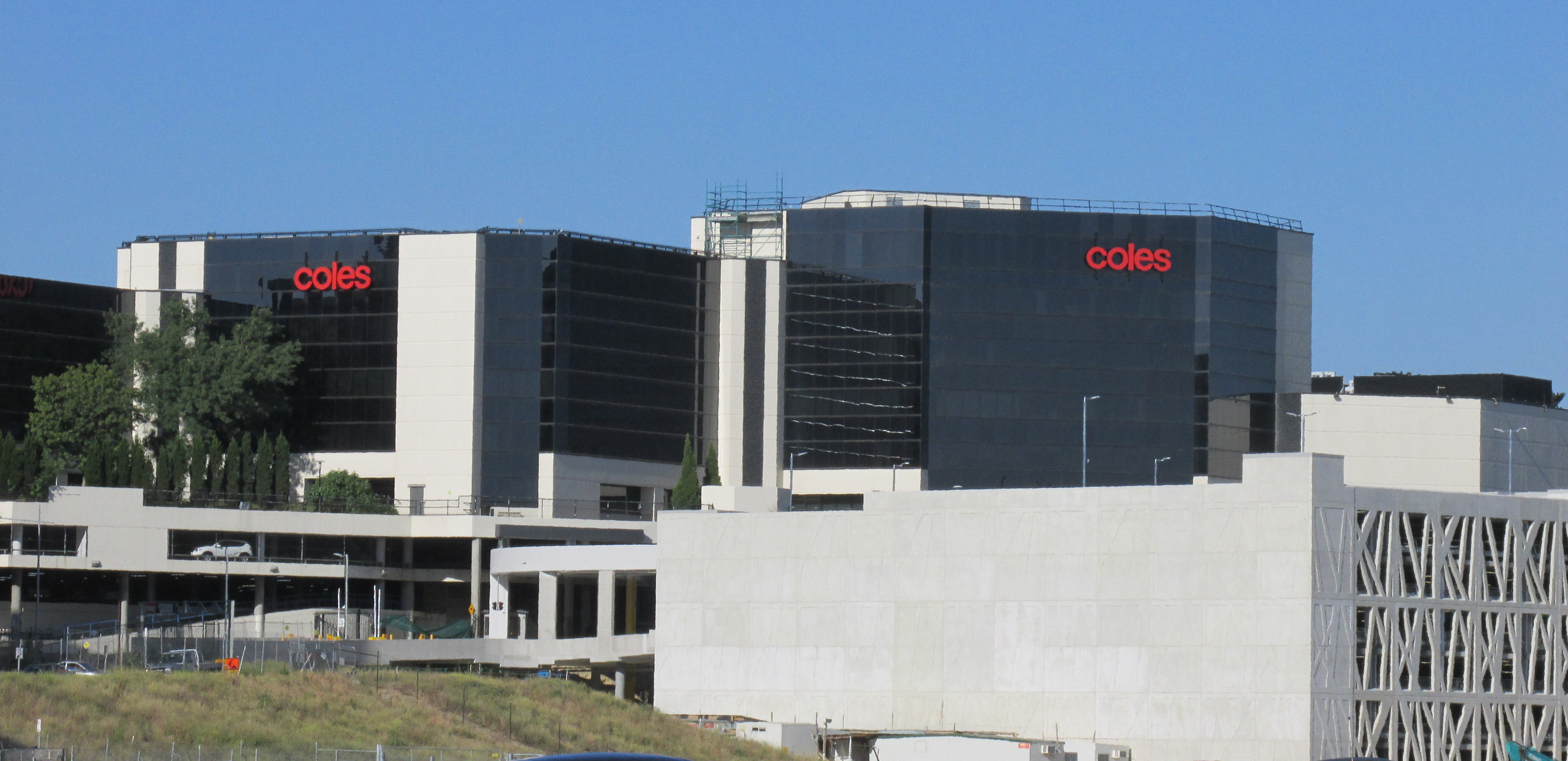
- Coles headquarters site, adjacent to Toorak Road in Hawthorn East, Victoria
- Trade name: Coles
- Type: Subsidiary
- Industry: Retail, supermarket and consumer services
- Founded: 1914; 112 years ago
- Founder: George Coles
- Headquarters: Hawthorn East, Victoria, Australia
- Number of locations: 861 stores List: 830 Coles supermarkets; 31 Coles Local stores; (2025)
- Area served: Australia
- Key people: Leah Weckert (managing director)
- Revenue: ▲A$44.487 billion (2025)
- Operating income: ▲A$2.077 billion (2025)
- Total assets: ▲A$20.294 billion (2025)
- Number of employees: ~115,000 (2025)
- Parent: Coles Group
- Subsidiaries: Coles Local; Coles Online
- Website: coles.com.au

Coles Supermarkets Australia Pty Ltd, trading as Coles, is an Australian supermarket, retail and consumer services chain headquartered in the Melbourne suburb of Hawthorn East as part of Coles Group.

Founded in 1914 in the suburb of Collingwood by Sir George Coles, Coles operated 861 stores in 2025, comprising 830 Coles supermarkets and 31 Coles Local stores, and employed about 115,000 people. It accounts for about 29 per cent of national supermarket retail sales. Coles Online is the company's online shopping service.

Between 1986 and 2006, Coles Supermarkets was a brand of Coles Myer, later Coles Group, before Wesfarmers acquired Coles Group in 2007. It became a subsidiary of Coles Group again after Wesfarmers spun off the business in November 2018. In October 2020, Coles launched "Value the Australian Way" as its brand platform.

== History ==
George Coles learned the retail trade working for his father's "Coles Store" business from 1910 to 1913. The store continued operating as "The Original Coles" at Wilmot, Tasmania, until it was destroyed by fire on 24 January 2014. Coles itself was founded when George Coles opened the Coles Variety Store on 9 April 1914 on Smith Street in the Melbourne suburb of Collingwood.

Coles expanded into food retailing in 1958 when it acquired the 54-store John Connell Dickins grocery chain. It then acquired the Beilby's chain in South Australia in 1959 and the 265-store Matthews Thompson grocery chain in New South Wales in 1960.

Inside a Coles supermarket in Sydney in 1968

In 1960, Coles opened its first supermarket in the Melbourne suburb of North Balwyn. In 1962, the first Coles New World supermarket opened in Frankston, Victoria. Coles' supermarkets were subsequently branded Coles New World, with accompanying Space Age-themed imagery. By 1973, Coles had established stores in all Australian capital cities.

In 1991, the stores were rebranded Coles Supermarkets and, from 1998, simply as Coles.

In 2004, the liquor division office (Coles Liquor Group) was moved from Chullora in Sydney to the company headquarters in Hawthorn East, Melbourne. Coles Myer CEO John Fletcher said the move would improve efficiency between the food and liquor divisions. The move also resulted in the retirement of Craig Watkins, a 35-year company veteran and director of Coles Liquor.

From mid-2006, many Bi-Lo supermarkets were rebranded as Coles supermarkets. Newmart, the Western Australian supermarket chain acquired by Bi-Lo in 1996, had seven stores rebranded as Coles in 2002. Newmart stores located near existing Coles stores were sold to Foodland and rebranded as the now-defunct Action Supermarkets chain. The Bi-Lo conversion program was put on hold at Easter 2007.

In July 2007, Wesfarmers agreed to acquire Coles Group for $22 billion. The purchase was completed in early 2008. In August 2007, as Wesfarmers foreshadowed its plans for the restructuring of Coles Group following its anticipated takeover, it stated that one of three planned divisions would comprise supermarkets, liquor and convenience stores.

From 2008 to 2014, Coles was led by British retail executive Ian McLeod.

In February 2011, Coles acquired National Australia Bank's 50 per cent interest in Australia's largest loyalty program, Flybuys, giving it full ownership. In September 2011, Coles commenced stocking private-label clothing in its stores, with several stores receiving refits to accommodate the range.

In 2018, Wesfarmers announced its intention to demerge the Coles business while retaining a 20 per cent interest. Steven Cain was appointed chief executive of the Coles supermarkets business as part of the demerger.

Coles deployed its first electric truck in April 2022. The first fully electric delivery vans followed in August 2023.

In April 2023, Coles opened its first Witron-powered automated distribution centre in Redbank, Queensland. In the second half of 2024, Coles opened two highly automated 87,000-square-metre (940,000 sq ft) customer fulfilment centres powered by Ocado technology in Truganina, Victoria, and Wetherill Park, New South Wales.

A second Witron distribution centre opened in Kemps Creek, New South Wales, in August 2024, and construction of a third in Truganina was announced in October 2024. In the same month, Coles deployed its first fully electric prime mover.

== Advertising and branding ==
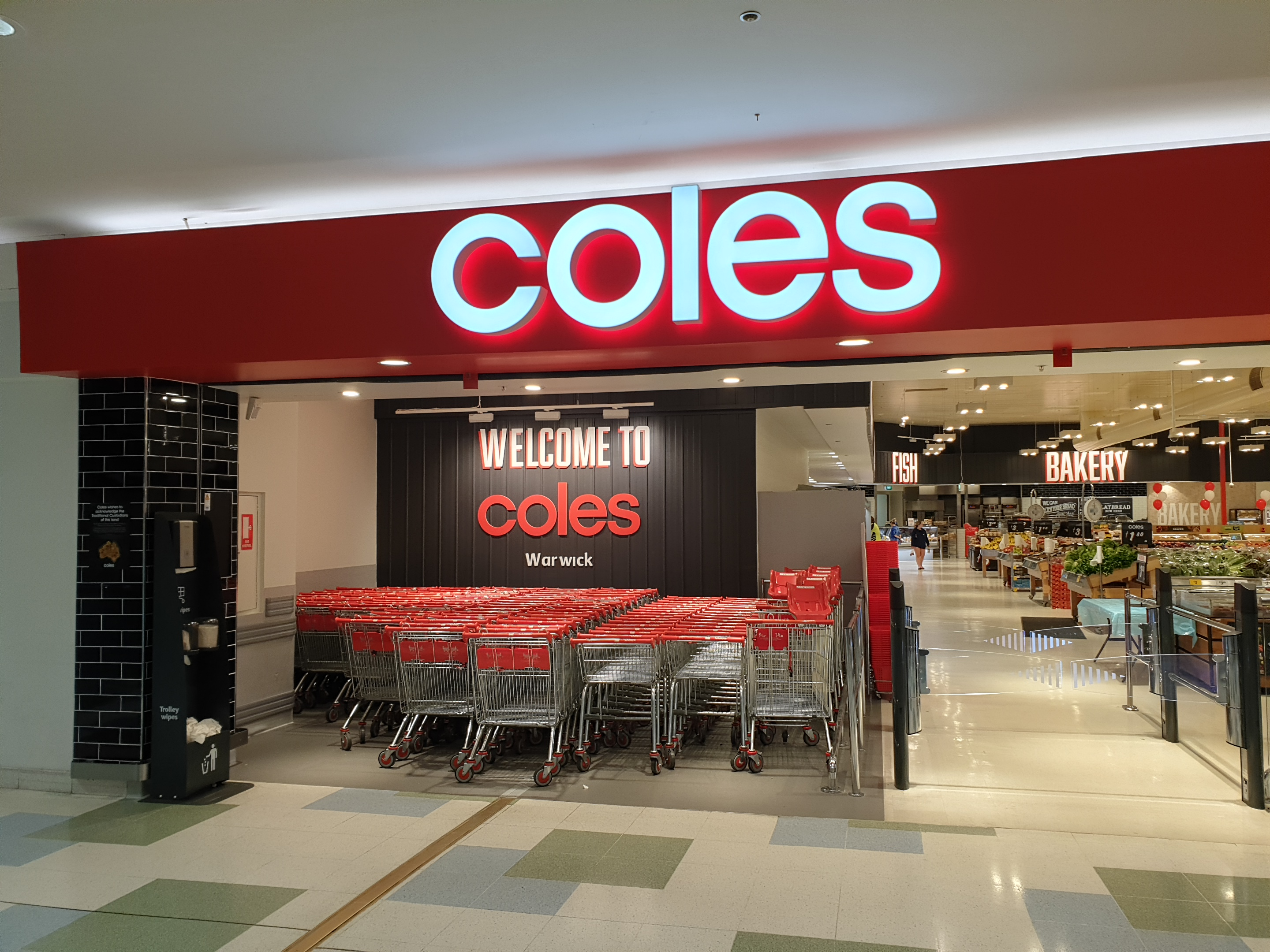
A Coles supermarket in a shopping centre in Warwick, Western Australia

The early Coles variety-store chain used the slogan "Nothing over 2/6", referring to its policy of selling goods for no more than two shillings and sixpence.

In the 1960s, Coles sponsored a general knowledge quiz show, Coles £3000 Question (later Coles $6000 Question and Coles $7000 Question), which aired on Channel 7.

The slogan "Save everyday" was later changed to "save every day".

In June 2010, Coles introduced its "Down Down" program as a longer-term price-discounting campaign. The campaign used a version of Status Quo's 1975 song "Down Down".

In May 2017, the "Down Down" campaign was refreshed with Australian Idol contestant Casey Donovan, who appeared in a disco version of the advertisement. In March 2018, Coles moved away from "Down Down" as its central advertising platform in favour of "Good things".

In October 2020, Coles launched the "Value the Australian Way" brand platform.

== Radio station ==
Coles Radio was launched in January 2014 as an in-store radio service in partnership with DMG Radio Australia, now Nova Entertainment.

== Private-label brands ==
=== Current private-label brands ===
Coles sells products under several private-label brands.

==== Coles ====
The Coles range replaced the former "You'll love Coles" brand.

==== Coles Simply ====
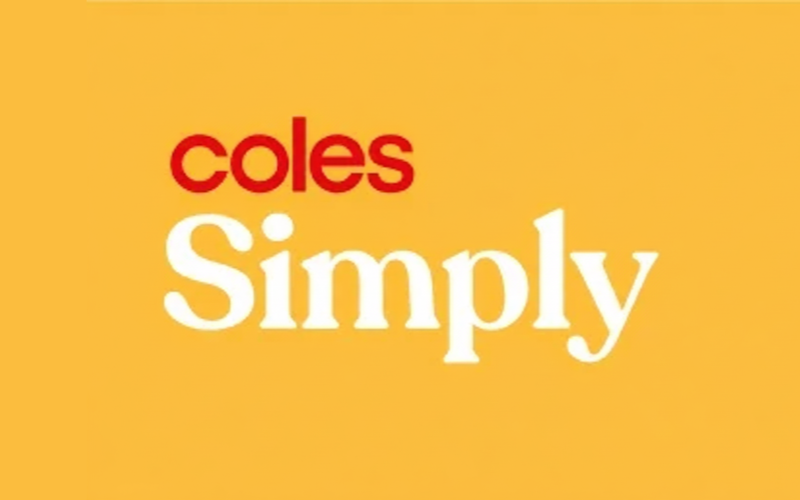
Coles Simply logo

Coles Simply is a value private-label range.

==== Coles Finest ====
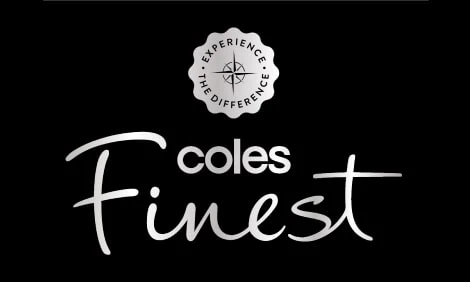
Coles Finest logo

Coles Finest is a premium private-label range launched in 2006.

==== Coles Organic ====
Coles Organic is a private-label range of organic products.

==== Coles Ultra ====
Coles Ultra is a private-label range of household cleaning products.

=== Former private-label brands ===
Former private-label brands include:

- Coles Green Choice
- Embassy
- Farmland
- Mix
- Savings
- Simply Gluten Free
- Simply Less
- Smart Buy
- You'll love Coles

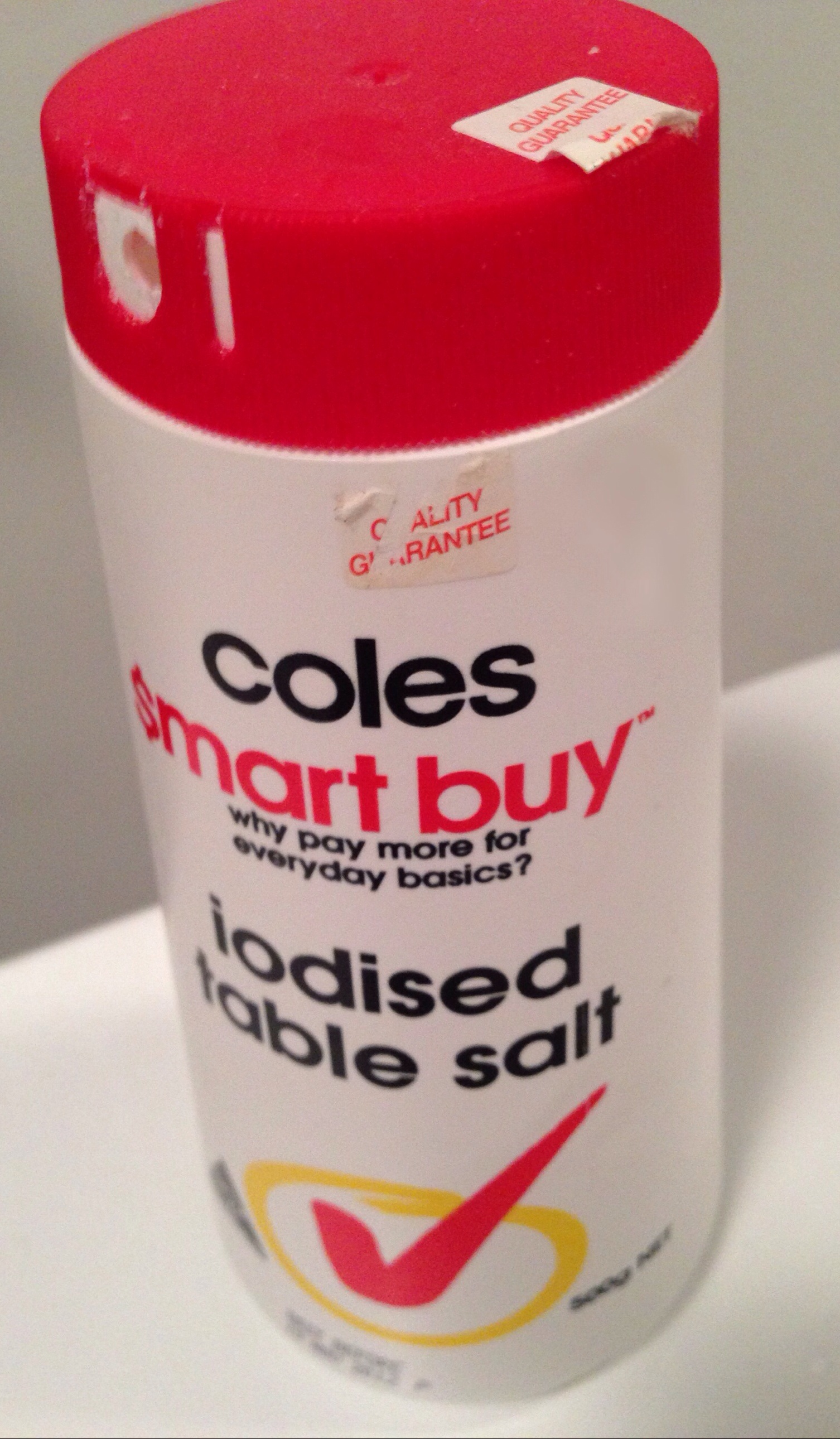
Coles Smart Buy brand salt

== Notable promotions ==
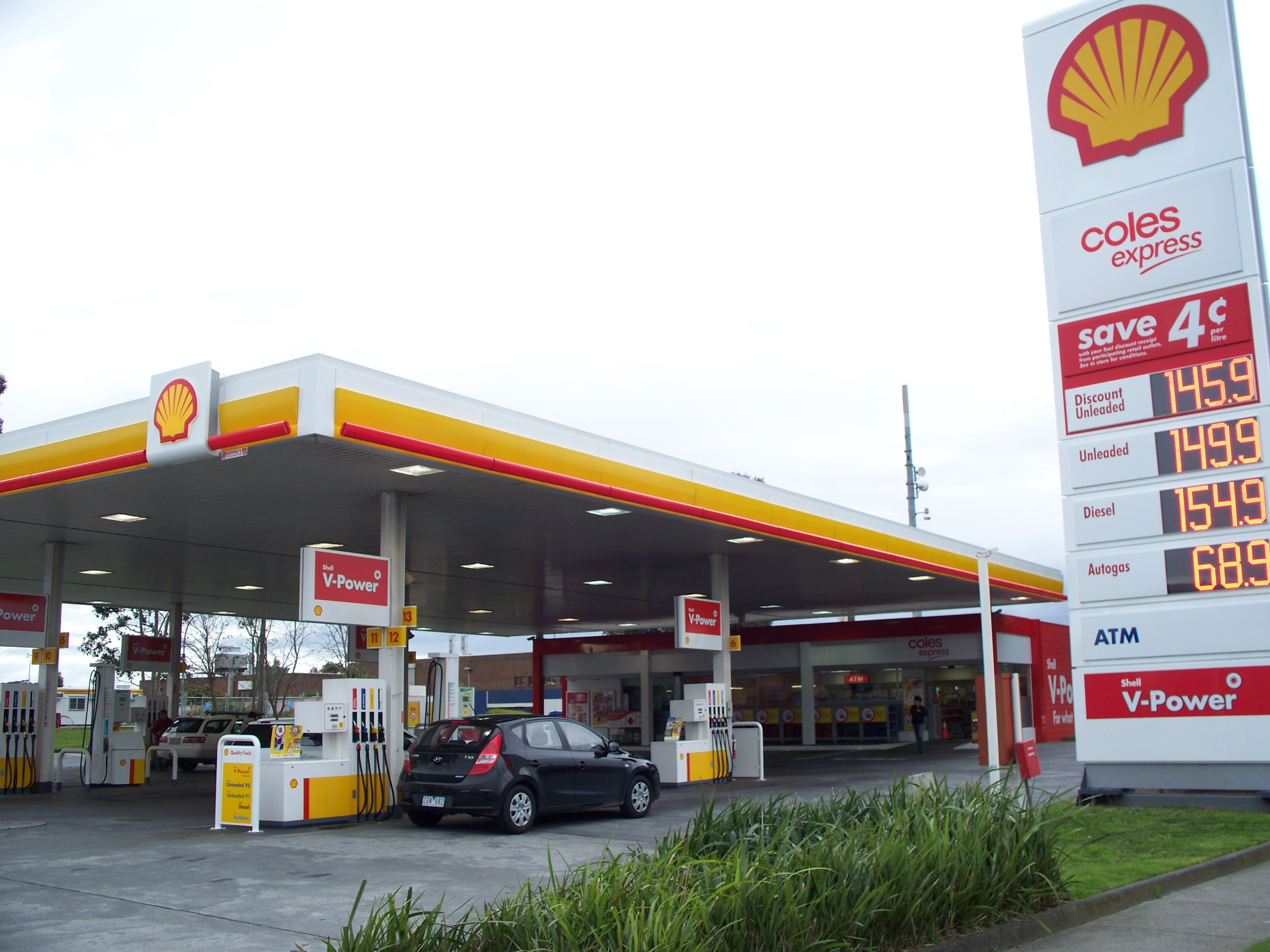
A Coles Express petrol station

- Coles historically offered fuel discount vouchers through Coles Express, including an ordinary four-cent-per-litre discount linked to supermarket spending. Competition-law expert Frank Zumbo criticised fuel-discount schemes on the basis that the discounts could be cross-subsidised by higher grocery and petrol prices.
- Customers can collect Flybuys points at Coles.
- Between 1991 and 1993, Coles ran the "Apples for Students" promotion with Apple Inc. and 12 major suppliers. Students collected grocery receipts for participating schools, which could exchange them for Macintosh computers once specified spending thresholds were reached. Seventy per cent of Australia's schools and kindergartens participated, receiving more than 25,000 computers, equipment and software worth $13.6 million.
- In 2010, Coles ran a similar program called "Sports for Schools", in which customers collected coupons for participating schools to exchange for sports equipment. The program was run again in 2011, 2012, 2018 and 2020.
- In 2018, Coles ran a collectibles promotion called Little Shop featuring miniature grocery items. Competitor Woolworths said that the success of the promotion had reduced customer visits to its stores. Coles subsequently revived the promotion, with the collectibles returning for the Christmas period.

== Political advocacy ==
Coles publicly supported the Yes campaign in the 2023 Australian Indigenous Voice referendum.

== Controversies ==
=== Pricing and supplier practices ===
In May 2010, the Senate Economics References Committee published Milking it for all it’s worth—competition and pricing in the Australian dairy industry, a report outlining concerns about pricing and competition in the dairy sector. These concerns intensified during the "milk wars" after Coles reduced the price of its private-label milk to $1 per litre on Australia Day 2011. The Australian Dairy Farmers Association called for an investigation into the implications of the reduction, and a further Senate report into its sustainability was published in November 2011. The report recommended that "the government takes steps to promote awareness of options for agricultural industries to develop more effective collective bargaining arrangements."

In May 2014, the Australian Competition & Consumer Commission (ACCC) commenced legal action against Coles, alleging that it had misled suppliers and used undue pressure to extract rebates from them. More than 50 suppliers had spoken confidentially to the ACCC about Coles' Active Retail Collaboration program, under which approximately 200 smaller suppliers were required to pay rebates. In December 2014, Coles was ordered to pay $11.2 million in penalties and costs.

In April 2015, Coles was fined $2.5 million for misleading consumers through claims that some of its bread was freshly baked in store, including the phrases "Freshly Baked In-Store" and "Baked Today, Sold Today". Some of the products had been partially baked overseas months earlier, including in Germany, Denmark and Ireland. The Federal Court also prohibited Coles for three years from advertising bread as baked on the day of sale unless that representation was true.

In February 2024, Four Corners examined the market power and pricing practices of Coles and Woolworths, which are sometimes collectively referred to as "Colesworth". The program reported that it had obtained leaked emails concerning a supplier's request for a price increase. Coles initially declined the request, citing concerns about its effect on customers; after the supplier agreed to a $25,000 one-off payment for promotions, Coles accepted the price increase and passed the higher price on to consumers.

In September 2024, the ACCC commenced legal action against Coles, alleging that it had made misleading discount representations through its "Down Down" promotions. The ACCC alleged that between February 2022 and May 2023, Coles temporarily increased the prices of 245 products before placing them on "Down Down" promotions at prices that were still higher than, or the same as, their previous regular prices. In May 2026, the Federal Court of Australia found that Coles had made false or misleading representations in 13 of the 14 "Down Down" tickets considered during the liability hearing. Penalties and other orders were to be determined later.

In May 2026, Coles paid $39,600 in infringement-notice penalties after the ACCC alleged that two milk supply agreements contravened the Dairy Code of Conduct by requiring suppliers to supply milk exclusively to Coles while imposing caps on the maximum volume of milk that could be produced. Payment of an infringement-notice penalty does not constitute an admission of a contravention.

=== Palantir partnership ===
In February 2024, Coles entered a three-year partnership with US software company Palantir Technologies to deploy its Foundry analytics platform and Artificial Intelligence Platform across more than 840 supermarkets. The systems were introduced for purposes including workforce planning and analysing workforce-related expenditure, and were designed to bring together more than 10 billion rows of operational data covering stores, employees, shifts and work allocations.

University of Queensland researcher Luke Munn argued that the partnership raised concerns about data-driven employee surveillance, managerial control and increasing operational dependence on Palantir's platform.

In July 2026, advocacy group GetUp! launched an advertising campaign urging Coles to end the Palantir partnership. Coles said that Palantir's software had no direct access to customer-surveillance feeds and was deployed within Coles' own environment. The company said it used the software for functions including supply-chain management, bakery production planning, staff rostering, trading-performance analysis and evaluation of promotions. Following public pressure by GetUp! and the public, Coles announced that they would not renew their contract with Palantir after it expired in 2027.

=== Workers' rights ===
In February 2020, Coles disclosed that it had underpaid salaried employees by about $20 million over six years after identifying deficiencies in its treatment of penalty rates, allowances and overtime.

In December 2021, the Fair Work Ombudsman commenced legal action against Coles. An amended claim filed in December 2022 alleged that Coles had underpaid 7,805 salaried employees a total of $113.8 million and that $107 million remained outstanding.

In September 2025, the Federal Court held that employees paid annual salaries must receive at least their minimum award entitlements in each pay period and that excess payments in one pay period generally cannot be used to offset a shortfall in another.

For the 2026 financial year, Coles recorded a $235 million provision relating to the underpayment matter, equivalent to $165 million after tax.

=== Animal welfare ===
In 2013, Coles announced that it would stock only cage-free eggs in its own-brand range and pledged that, by 2025, all shell eggs and egg ingredients in its own-brand products would be cage-free. In 2025, Coles moved the target to 2030, saying that 85 per cent of its eggs were cage-free and citing supply-chain disruption caused by outbreaks of avian influenza.

== Gallery ==
A Coles supermarket in Canberra

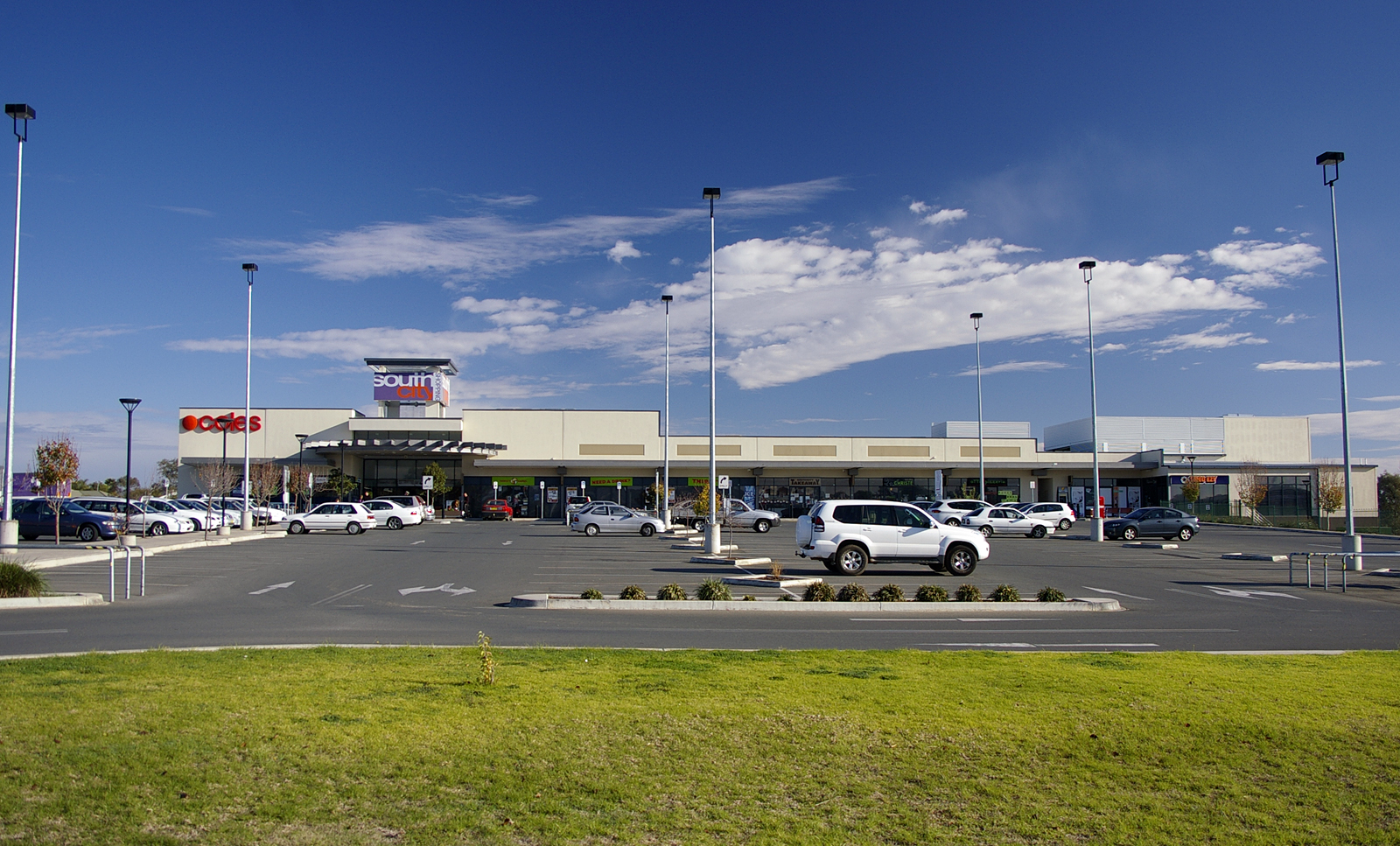
A Coles store in Glenfield Park, New South Wales

A Coles store in Boorooma, New South Wales

A Coles store at a shopping centre in Hawthorn, Victoria

A Coles store in Engadine, New South Wales

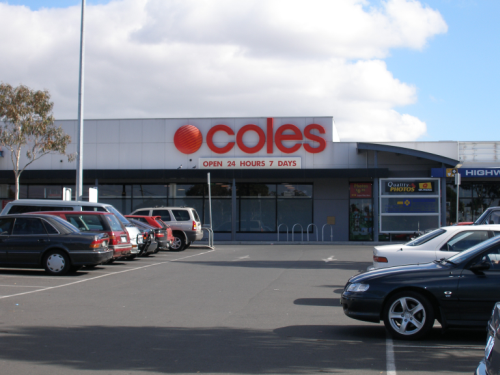
A Coles supermarket in Springvale, Victoria

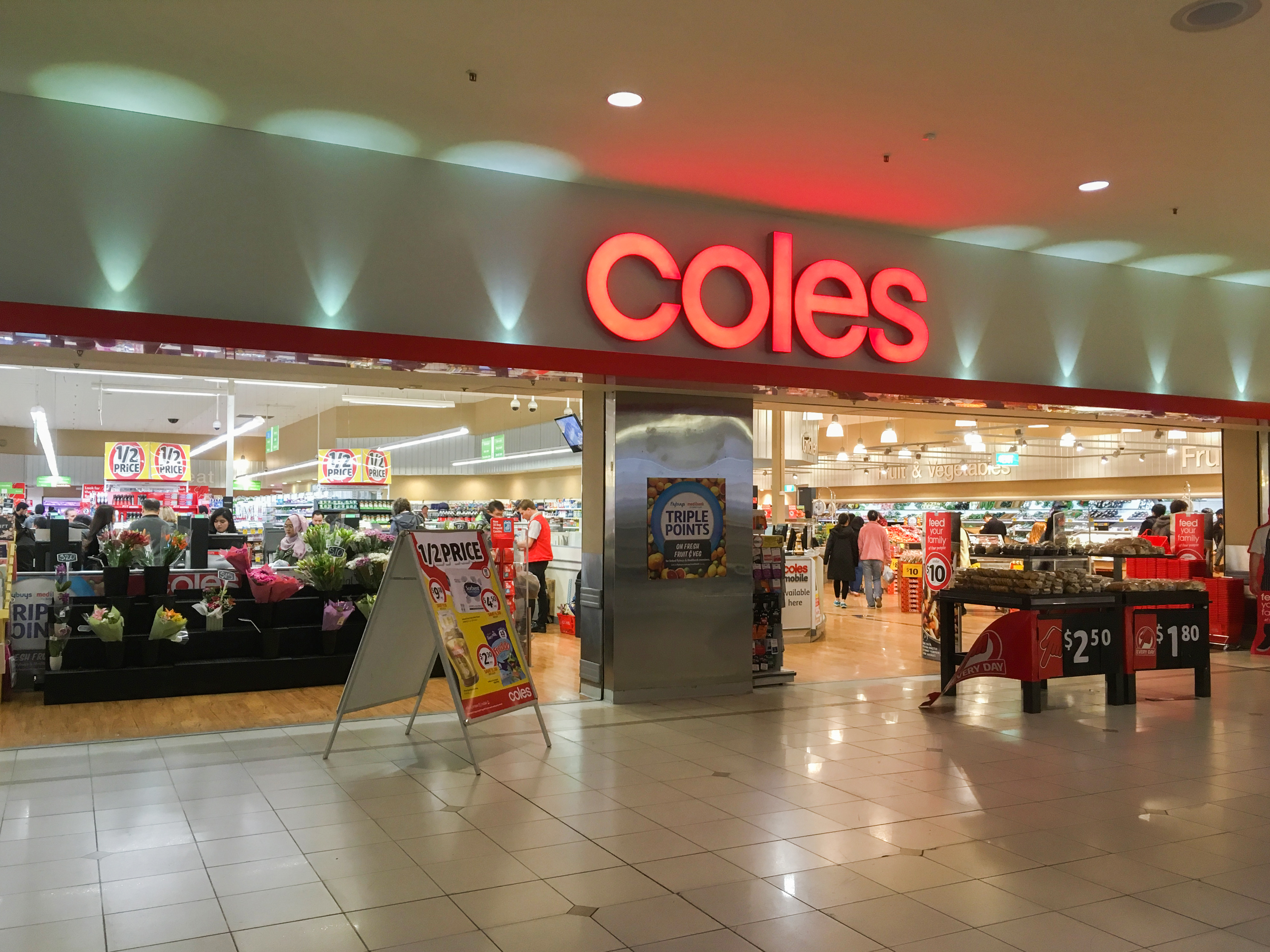
A Coles store in Chadstone Shopping Centre, Malvern East, Victoria

A refurbished Coles supermarket in Berwick, Victoria

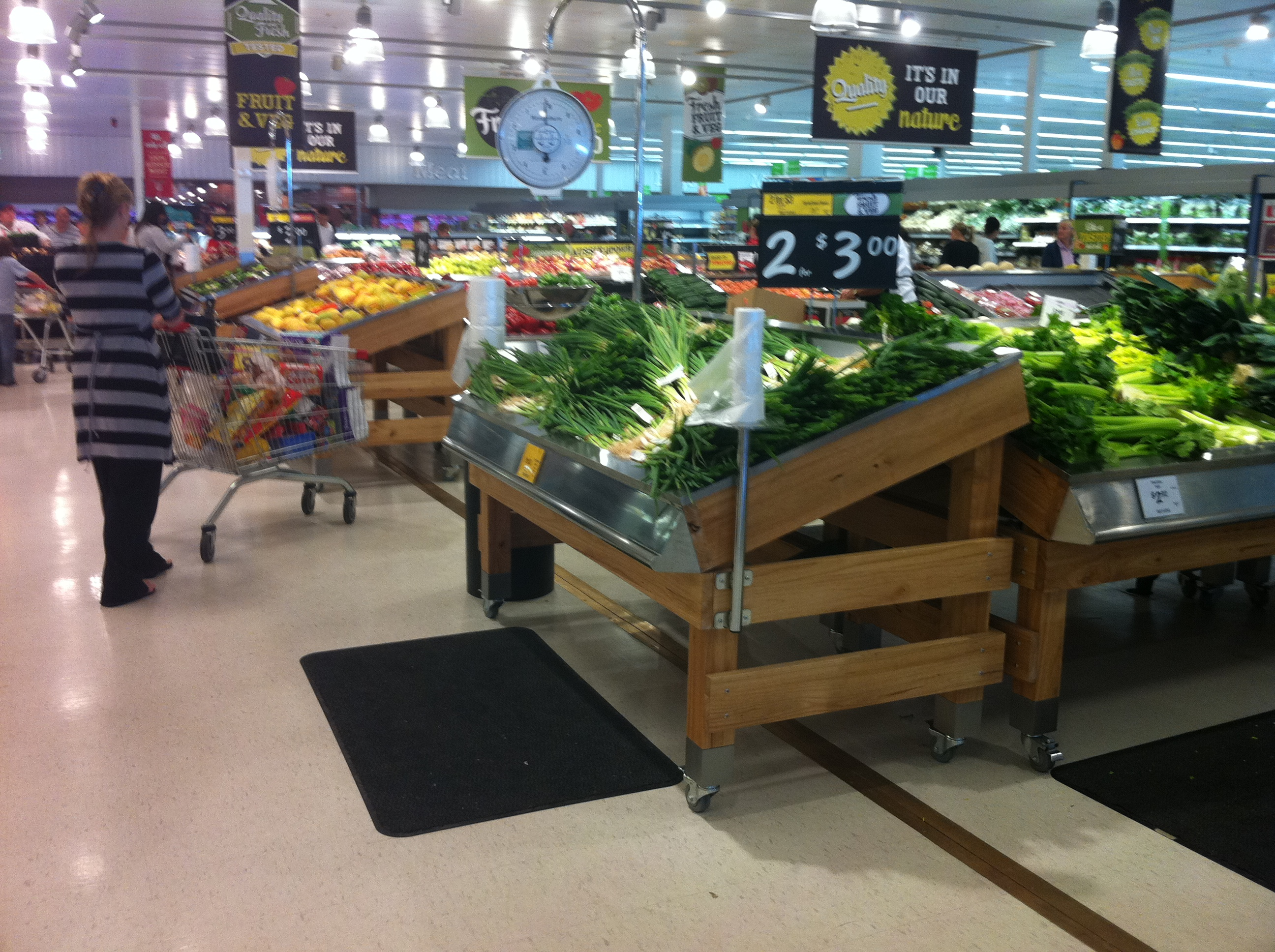
The inside of the refurbished Coles supermarket in Berwick, Victoria

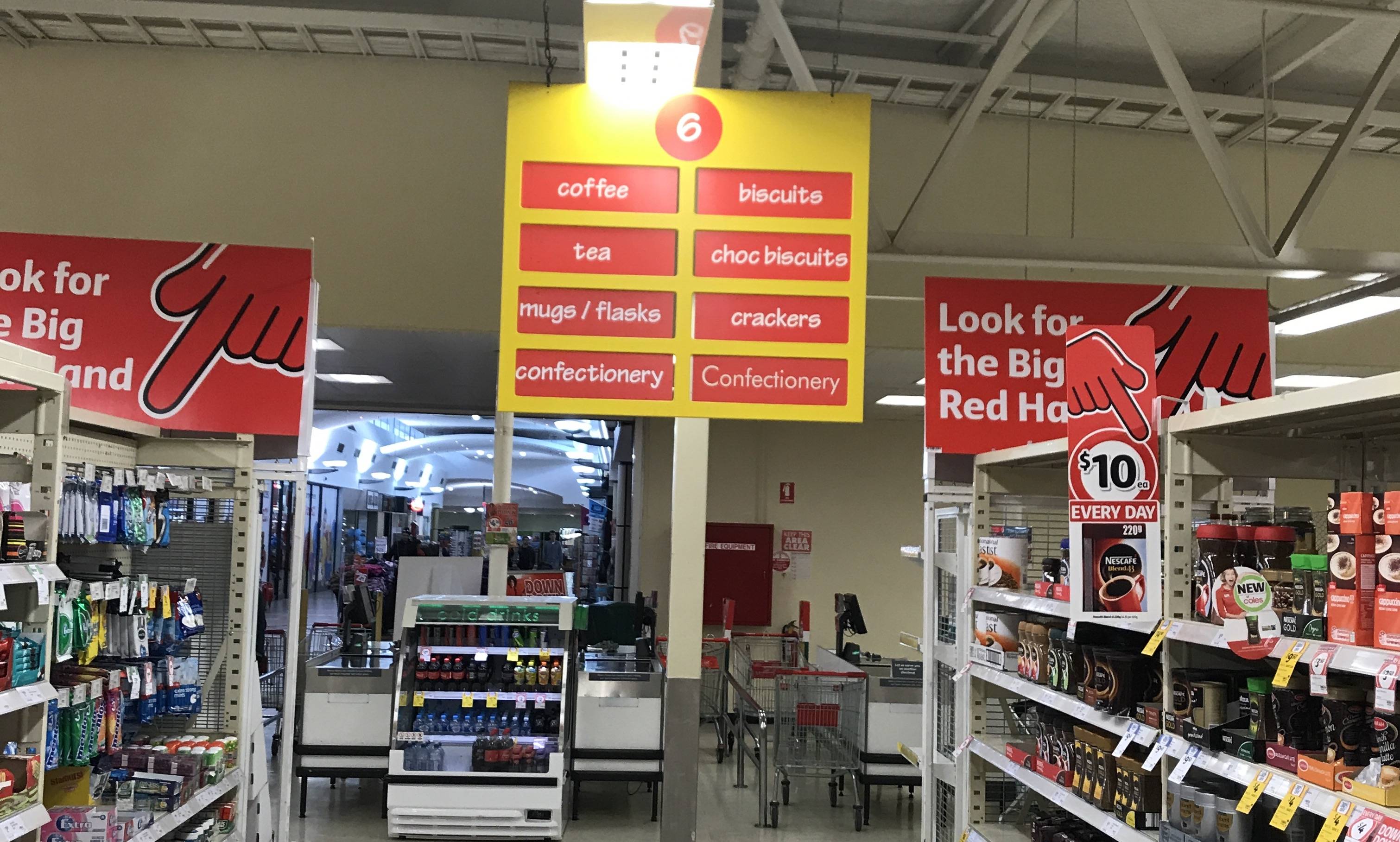
Coles Bentley, WA (now closed) was still sporting the Newmart fit-out in 2017

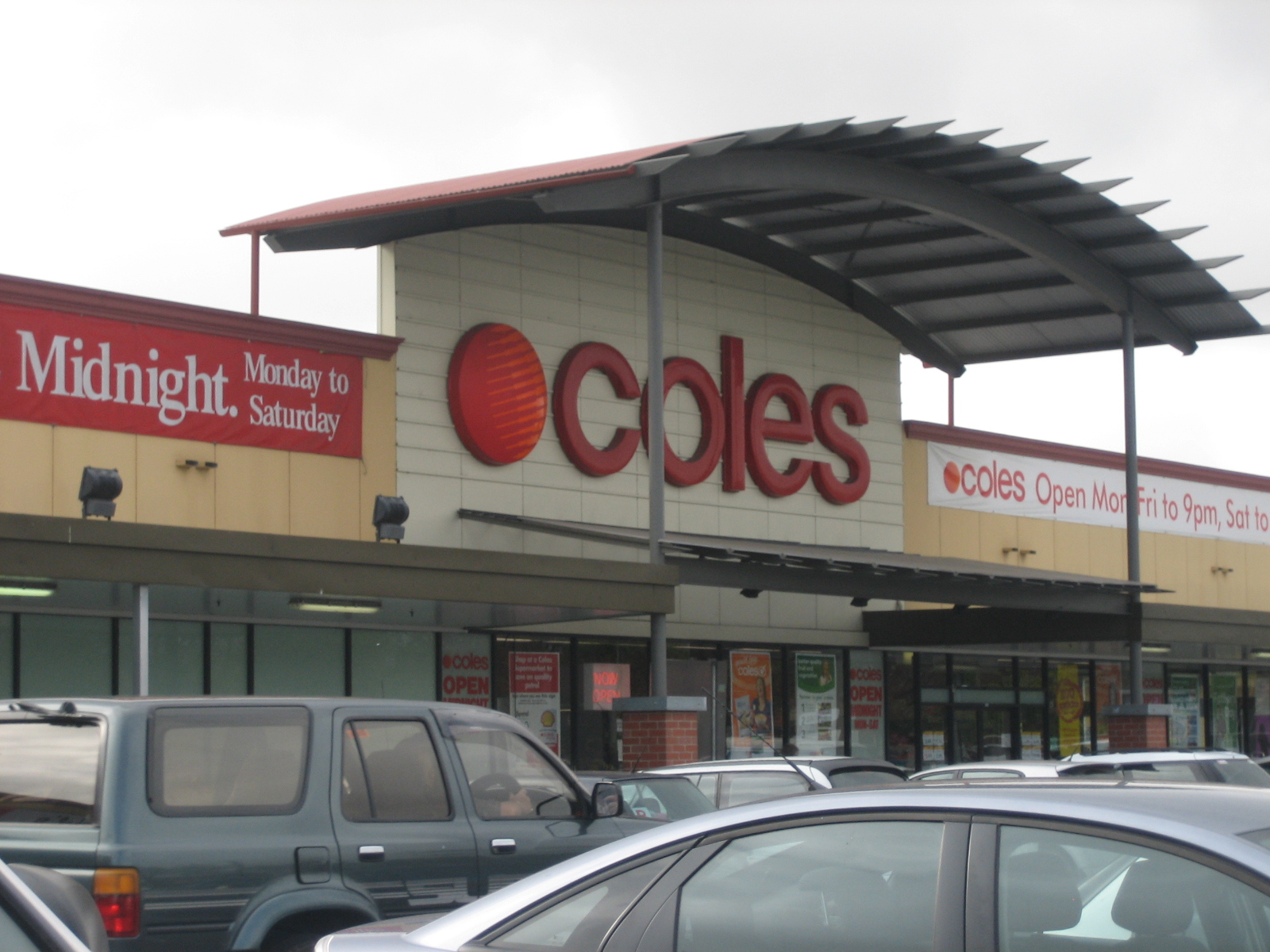
A Coles supermarket at Kurralta Central, Adelaide

== See also ==
- List of supermarket chains in Oceania
- Pick n Pay Stores
