= OTR (convenience store) =

Australian convenience store chain owned by Viva Energy

- Logo since 2015

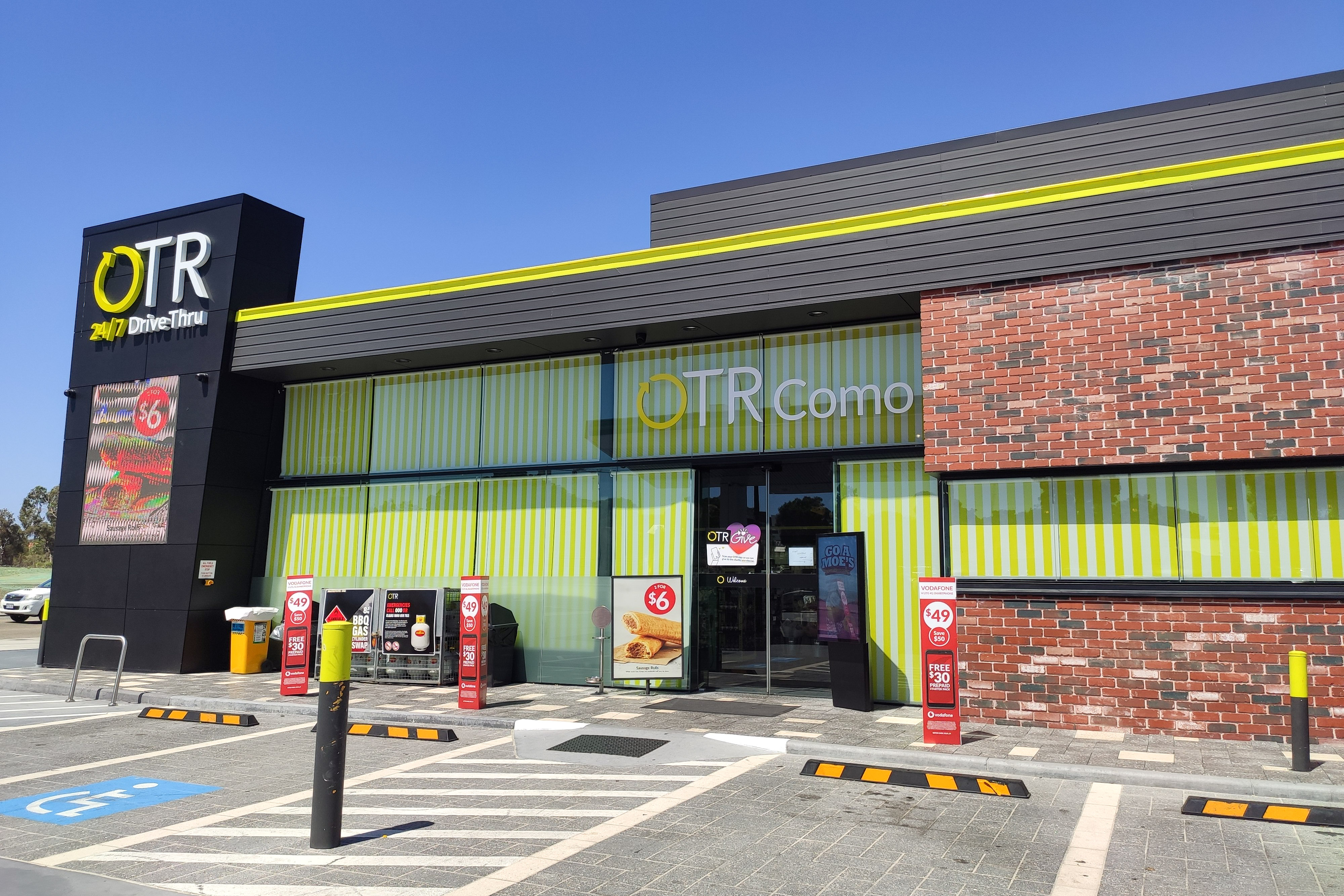
- An OTR store in Como, Western Australia
- Type: Subsidiary
- Industry: Convenience store
- Founded: 1999; 27 years ago in Adelaide
- Founder: Fred Shahin
- Headquarters: Australia
- Number of locations: 193 stores (2025)
- Area served: All mainland Australian states and territories
- Parent: Viva Energy
- Website: otr.com.au

OTR, formerly On the Run, is an Australian chain of petrol stations and convenience stores based in South Australia. Unrelated to ExxonMobil's On the Run store branding, the OTR brand was first established in 1999 by the Shahin family (Peregrine Corporation), who had already owned and operated service stations in Adelaide since 1984. It owns OTR and Store 24.

In March 2024, OTR was sold to Viva Energy, which retails Shell-branded fuel in Australia. Some Coles Express sites (also owned by Viva Energy) were or will be rebranded as OTR.

== Operations ==
Logo used prior to 2015

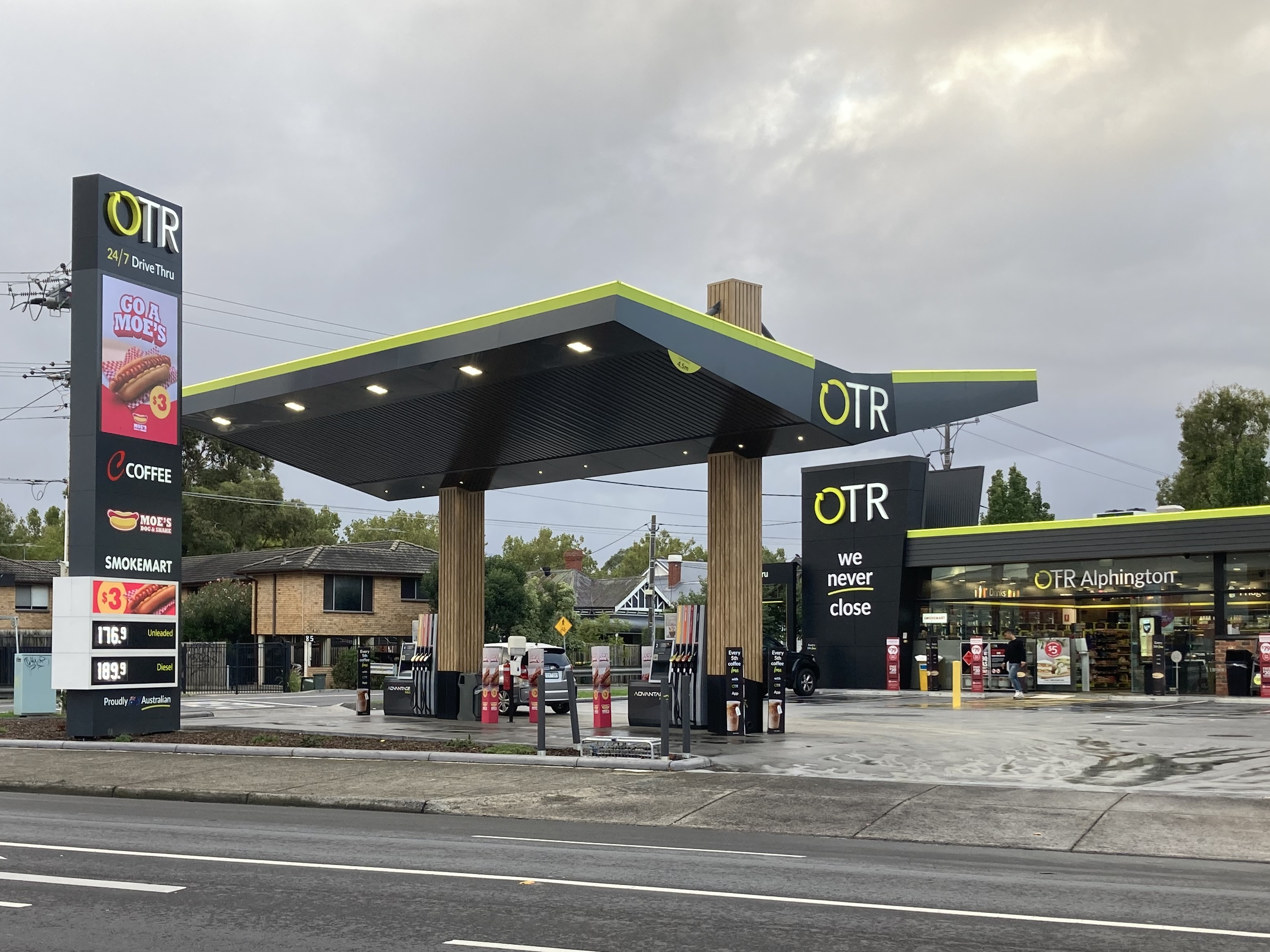
An OTR service station in Alphington, Melbourne

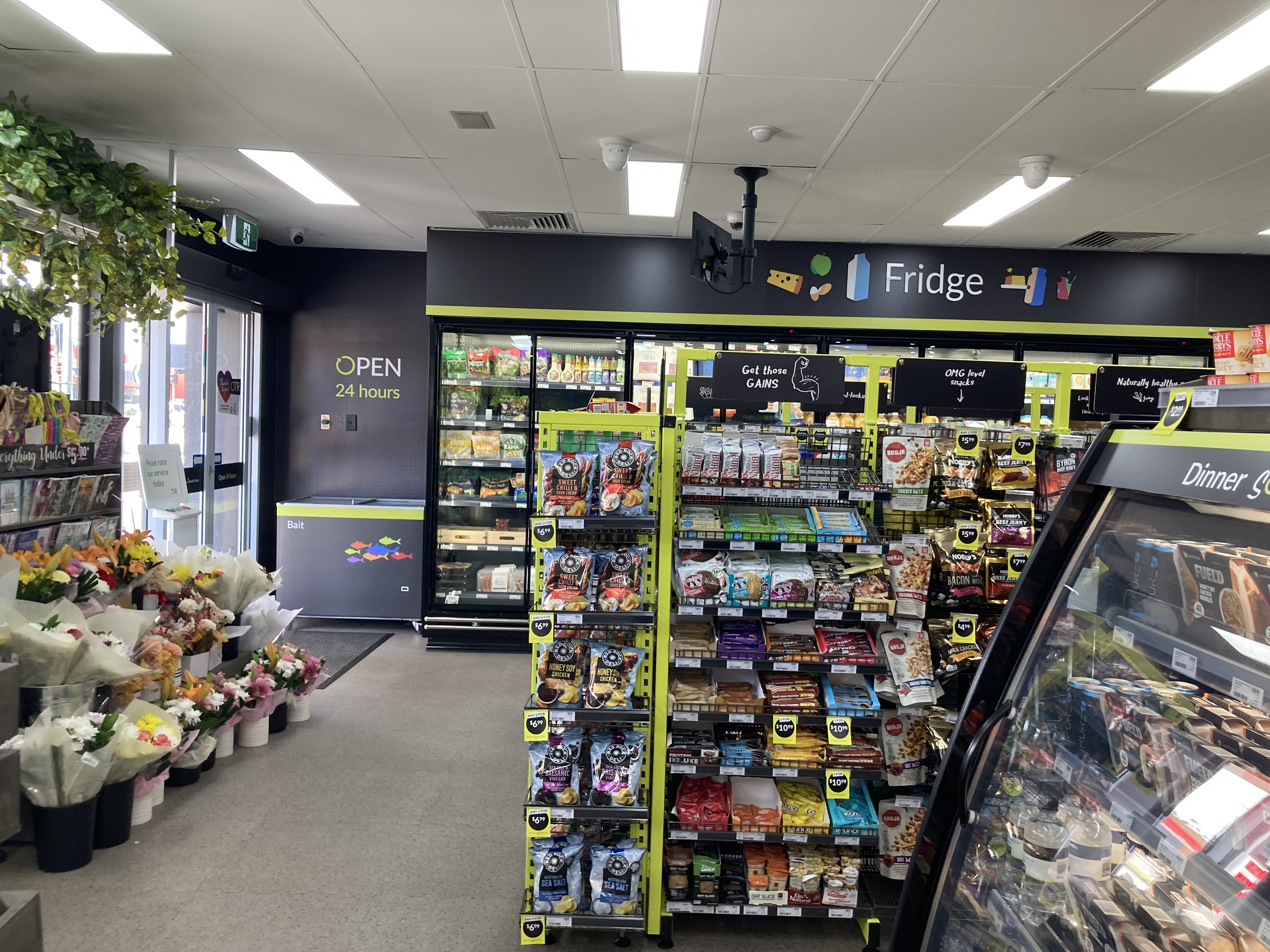
Interior of the OTR store in Lane Cove, Sydney, the first OTR store in New South Wales

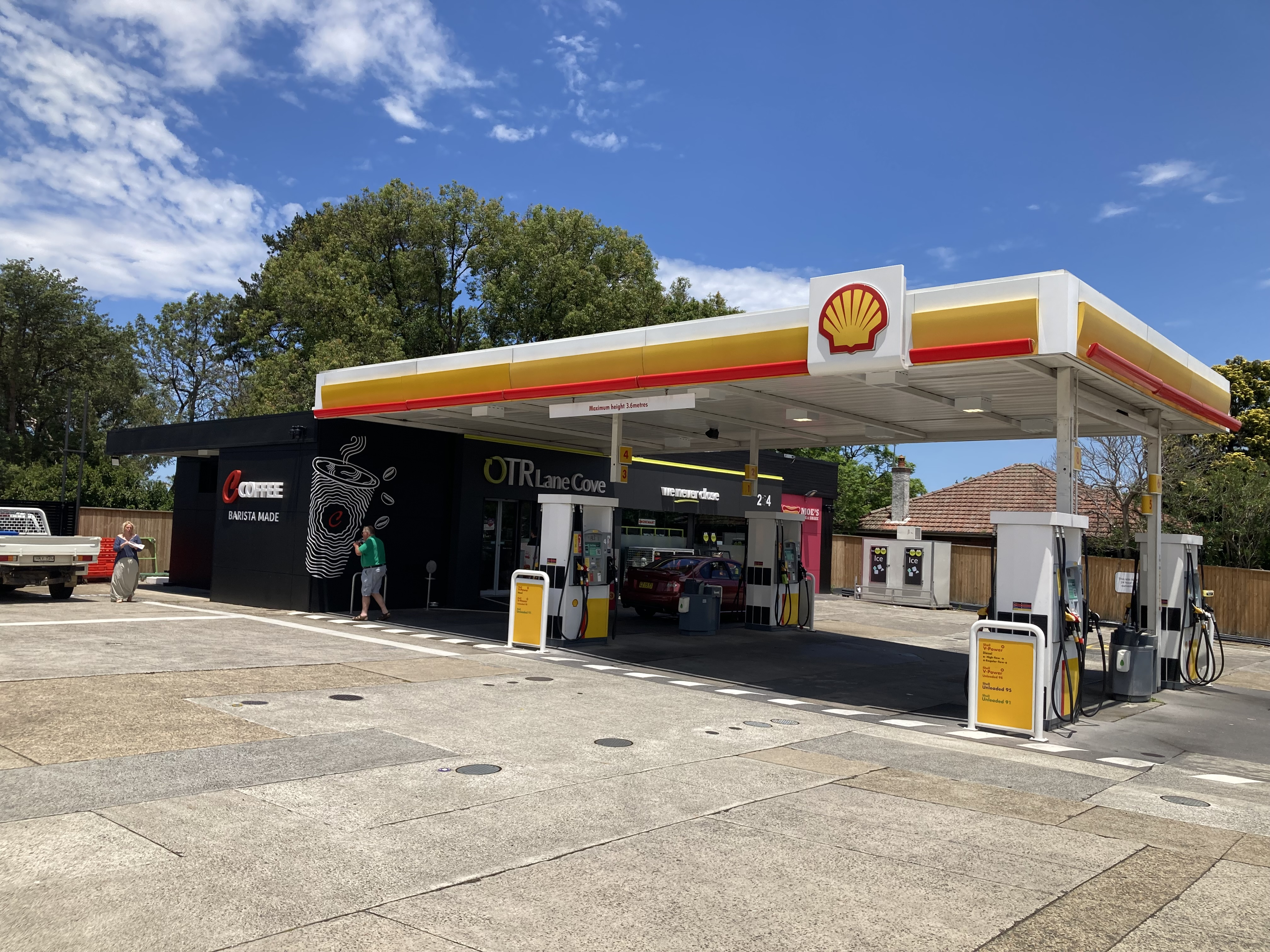
OTR service station in Lane Cove, selling Shell-branded fuel

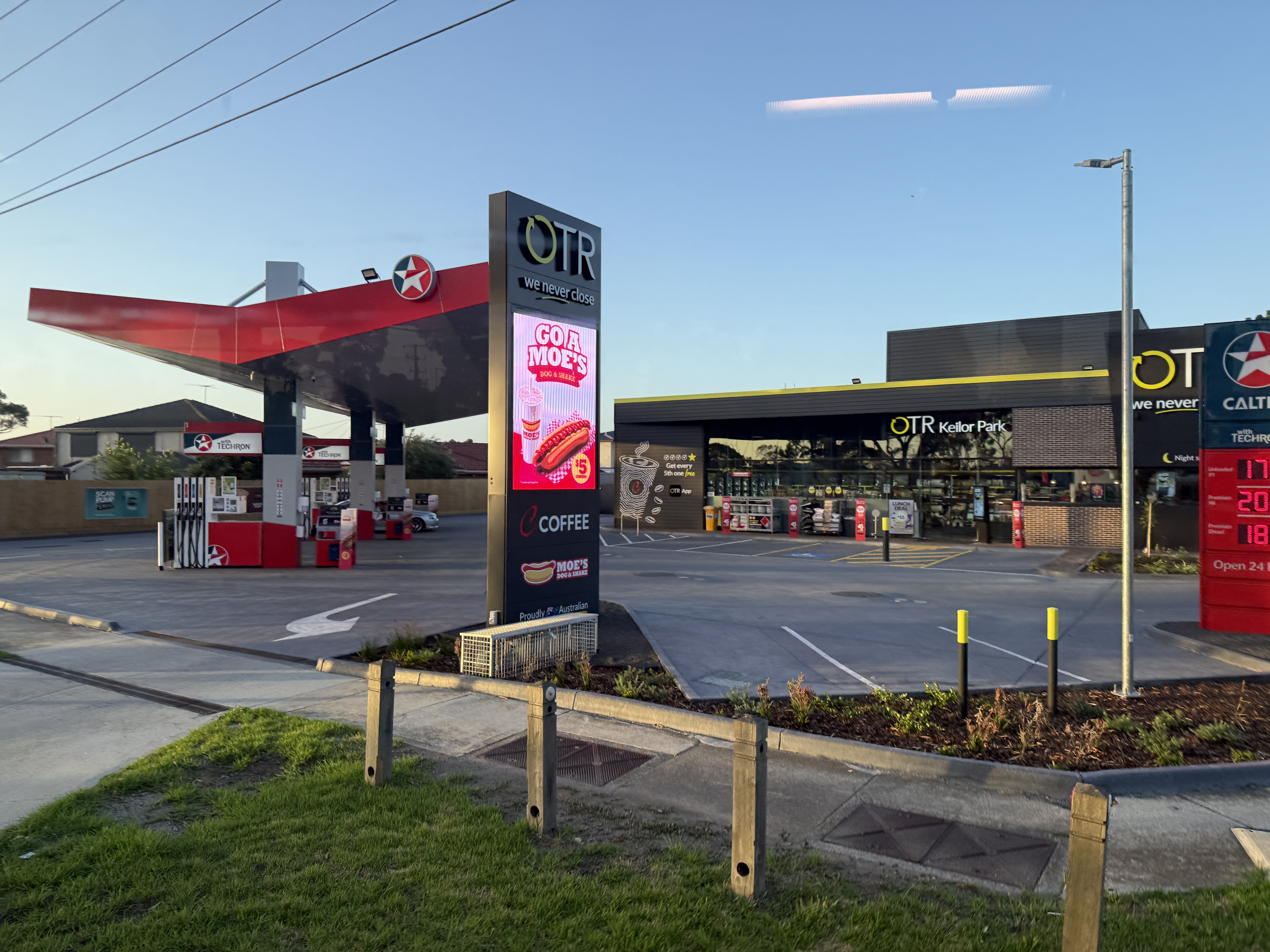
OTR service station in Keilor Park, Melbourne, selling Caltex-branded fuel

OTR is an umbrella brand of 24-hour convenience stores coupled with service stations owned and operated by Viva Energy. Many OTR outlets operate alongside other brands such as Subway, Wok in a Box, Oporto, Hungry Jack's, Guzman y Gomez and Krispy Kreme. OTR has also developed and launched a series of proprietary food and drinks brands to sell through their stores. These include C Coffee, Moe's Dog & Shake, OhJ!, CHILL and EAT.

As of October 2024, there were over 200 OTR sites across the country, majority of which are in South Australia. OTR initially had an agreement with BP for the supply of BP fuel including BP branding on OTR stations. As a result, the majority of the service station sites sold BP fuel. Some sites in other states sold Caltex or Shell fuel and were branded as such. For example, the Keilor Park site in Melbourne sold Caltex while the Lane Cove site in Sydney sold Shell. Additionally, a small number of sites were solely OTR-branded, such as the Glen Osmond site in Adelaide and the Alphington site in Melbourne.

After the sale of OTR to Viva (who owned the Shell brand in Australia) in 2024, OTR began to supply Shell fuel and rebranded previous BP or OTR-branded sites to Shell.

== History ==
=== Background ===
In 1984, Fred Shahin and his family moved to Australia. He bought his first BP service station in the Adelaide suburb of Woodville Park and various other tobacco outlets.

=== Growth under Shahin family ownership ===
By January 1999, the Shahin family owned and operated four drive-thru standalone convenience stores and thirteen fuel service stations in the Adelaide metropolitan area. The family operated the service stations under the BP brand across South Australia. In 1999, the family began using the On The Run brand, abbreviated as OTR, becoming the registered proprietor of the business name On The Run Convenience Store in South Australia on 1 March 1999 and On The Run in New South Wales on 15 March 1999.

In 2009, Peregrine acquired 29 Mobil stations in South Australia from 7-Eleven which had just bought over Mobil's retail business nationwide. Peregrine initially operated these sites as On the Run sites selling Mobil fuel, until most of them eventually switched to BP fuel as well.

In 2014, OTR acquired 25 BP-owned service stations. The store branding in those stations were later also changed to OTR, but continued to sell BP fuel. In 2015, On the Run began rebranding with a new logo using the shorter OTR brand.

Until 2019, most stores are located in South Australia, with one store in Irymple, Victoria, which opened in 2015. In 2019, OTR began planning expansion into other parts of Victoria and also New South Wales. Expansion into New South Wales did not eventuate until June 2023. Expansion into Victoria eventuated in March and April 2020, with two OTR-branded service stations opening in Horsham in western Victoria. Within metropolitan Melbourne, two OTR stores also opened at service stations in St Kilda and Alphington in 2022, with the Alphington service station solely branded OTR with two more stores located in Frankston and Moonee Ponds in 2024. Also in 2022, OTR opened its first Western Australia store in Roleystone, Perth, which was co-branded with Caltex rather than BP.

In early 2023, OTR acquired 17 Puma Energy service stations in the Northern Territory and Western Australia from Chevron Corporation, which also owns the Caltex fuel brand; Caltex fuel would be supplied to these stations. In June 2023, the first New South Wales OTR opened at a Shell-branded station in Lane Cove.

=== Sale to Viva Energy ===
In April 2023, Viva Energy, who owned the Shell and Liberty Oil brands in Australia, announced it would acquire OTR from Peregrine Corporation for A$1.15 billion. Viva also announced it was planning to transition Coles Express convenience stores to the OTR brand.

The transaction was subject to Australian Competition & Consumer Commission (ACCC) and Foreign Investment Review Board (FIRB) clearance. The acquisition would also include Peregrine's businesses of Smokemart and Giftbox (SMGB) and the remainder of Mogas. The Shahin family would also be a shareholder of Viva Energy.

The ACCC cleared the transaction in December 2023, conditional upon Viva Energy disposing of 25 sites in South Australia to Chevron which happened in February 2024. In exchange, Viva Energy would receive 13 Chevron sites (Caltex) located in Queensland, New South Wales and Western Australia. Those Chevron stores have been rebranded as Store 24 as of May 2024. At the time, the acquisition had still not been approved by the FIRB to finalise the acquisition.

As a result of the delayed acquisition of OTR, Viva announced in September 2023 that most Coles Express stores would instead be rebranded as Reddy Express, while others would be rebranded as OTR once the OTR acquisition was completed.

In March 2024, it was announced that the company had completed the purchase of OTR.

=== Viva Energy ownership ===
In November 2024, OTR began accepting Shell Cards at their 184 OTR sites. Around the same time, Viva Energy commenced rebranding the fuel offer at its OTR outlets across the country by replacing the old BP signage and independent OTR signage with the Shell signage. The previously-announced rebranding of some Coles Express stores to OTR also began by late 2024, with the first site renovations completed in December 2024.

== Trade mark legal action against ExxonMobil ==
In June 1999, in the same year the Shahin family began using the On the Run brand, Mobil (later ExxonMobil) applied to register the trade marks for the words Mobil on the Run (number 797720) and On the Run (number 797721) which it used internationally with its On the Run brand. The trade mark applications were for various classes of good and services including fuel and drinks. The Shahin family had been opposed to the application and the subsequent June 2001 registration of trade mark 797721, arguing that it had already intended to use the On the Run brand before Mobil's application in June 1999, with evidence of its development of Shahin's On the Run brand and the registration of the business name in the few months prior. Initially opposing via the Administrative Appeals Tribunal and the Australian Trade Marks Office, the legal action ended up as an appeal to the Federal Court of Australia.

Section 17 of the Trade Marks Act 1995 defines trade mark as "a sign used, or intended to be used, to distinguish goods or services dealt with or provided in the course of trade by a person from goods or services so dealt with or provided by any other person". In September 2005, the Federal Court of Australia could not find evidence that Shahin family's use and advertisement of its On the Run brand was "to distinguish one trader's goods from another", but instead was just an intention "to conduct a business under the name of 'On the Run' in the future". The use of the brand was also not a use of a trade mark under section 7 the Trade Marks Act 1995 as the use was not "physical in relation to goods or services". The court stated that the Shahin family never had any intention "to brand any goods with the mark". Therefore, the court ruled that the Shahin family "failed to show" that it has used On the Run as a mark", and hence could not prove itself to own the trade mark under common law. Shahin family's appeal was dismissed, clearing the way for ExxonMobil's registration of trade mark 797721 to be finalised.

While opposing ExxonMobil's trade mark registration, in the meanwhile, the family also applied to register the trade mark for its On the Run logo (number 865053) in 2001, which was accepted in 2008. By 2011, the Shahin family had gained ownership of the trade mark of the words On the Run.

== Community ==
OTR has also established an innovative charitable program called OTRGive in June 2018. Charities who've benefitted from OTR Give include Foodbank, Guide Dogs SA/NT, CFS Foundation, Variety, Canteen, Royal Flying Doctor Service and RSPCA.

In 2018, On The Run became the inaugural title sponsor of the Supercars Championship event The Bend SuperSprint at the Peregrine-owned The Bend Motorsport Park.

== Controversies ==
Nasmin Pty Ltd, owned by the Shahin family, was fined $28,000 in April 2016 for the dumping of 2,000 tonnes of soil (some of it slightly contaminated) on its farm taken from the redevelopment of an On The Run store in Plympton.

In 2018, the chain received criticism from consumers and environmental groups for a decision to ban reusable coffee cups due to a contamination incident at one of their stores. However, new food safety procedures were introduced and OTR reinstated their policy to accept reusable cups in September 2018.

A class action on behalf of 1,050 On The Run workers was lodged with the Federal Court of Australia on 13 May 2020. The company was accused of failing to pay overtime, underpaying staff and misusing its traineeship program as a method to reduce workers' pay, dating back to 2014 and involving all stores in South Australia. OTR allegedly used eight different wage minimisation tactics that enabled gross underpayment of its staff. In March 2020, the Federal Court had upheld a separate decision by South Australia's Employment Tribunal to award A$2,342 to an OTR employee who had been underpaid.

In 2020 there was opposition by local residents to a planned OTR outlet on Kensington Road in Kensington Park, and to the expansion of the Peregrine headquarters building in Kensington to a height of seven storeys with a helipad on top of the building.

In August 2020 Peregrine was ordered by the South Australian Employment Tribunal to pay A$65,000 to an employee after being found to have deliberately underpaid him over the period of about a year in 2016, at an OTR at Fulham.

== Awards ==
In 2018, Peregrine Corporation won the Australian Retail Awards '2018 Large Retailer of the Year' award which recognises the outstanding business outcomes of Australian retailers who continue to adapt, improve and innovate in their field.

In 2019, OTR won ‘Large Employer of the Year’ in South Australian Training Awards.
