= Coles Online =

Australian online retail store

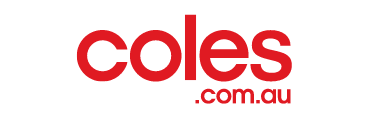
- Type: Division
- Industry: Online retail
- Founded: 1999; 27 years ago
- Headquarters: Hawthorn East, Melbourne, Victoria, Australia
- Number of locations: Australia-wide
- Key people: Ben Hassing (CEO ECommerce)
- Parent: Coles Supermarkets
- Website: shop.coles.com.au

Coles Online is an online retail site worked by Coles Supermarkets. The site offers a wide scope of ordinary basic food items for home delivery or "Click and Collect" areas. The site can deliver to over 85% of the Australian populace.

== History and development ==
Coles Online first accepted orders in 1999, delivering to selected areas in Sydney and Melbourne although the business model was unprofitable. During the 1999–2000 financial year, the business was reported to be losing 5.6% of sales revenue.

To acquire greater market share and reverse losses, Coles Online purchased Sydney based internet grocery store Shopfast in 2003. Although unprofitable, at the time Shopfast was the largest online grocer in Australia.

During this period, all orders placed by customers were filled in dedicated warehouses and it was not until 2007 when Coles Online, influenced by UK executives recruited to the company, moved to a store-based order fulfilment model.

In July 2008, to complement the new picking processes, Coles Online launched a new website with a view to making Internet shopping faster and easier for customers, as well as adding many new features already standard for other online grocery stores, but at that time still absent from the Coles site.

With the new website and order fulfilment model in place, Coles Online undertook an aggressive expansion program to extend delivery areas beyond Melbourne and Sydney, the only two cities included in the online program since 1999. In October 2008, the delivery area was extended to Newcastle and Canberra, as well as Brisbane and The Gold Coast, with the Sunshine Coast added in February 2009. By October 2009, Queensland was the top retail market for Coles Online in Australia, surpassing the New South Wales and Victoria regions that had been in operation for 10 years.

In April 2009, Coles Online began deliveries to Perth for the first time, and in June of the same year became the first major grocery retailer to introduce online shopping to Adelaide. Coles Online also began deliveries to Hamilton Island in mid 2009 and ceased them in 2016.

Coles relaunched its web site in 2013. This significantly improved the functionality of the site by including features such as comparison. The checkout process was also simplified with the ability to build a basket from a shopping list. Filtering of products by attributes was introduced and the product information enhanced through a contract with SKUvantage.

In August 2017, Coles partnered with Uber to trial home deliveries by Uber drivers from one of its dark stores.

In March 2019, Coles signed an agreement to partner with Ocado to build two highly automated customer fulfillment centres in Melbourne and Sydney. With a budget of $330 million, the centres are expected to open in 2024.

In March 2020, Coles began rolling out an online priority service to service elderly and vulnerable customers who cannot access groceries as a result of the COVID-19 outbreak.

== Technology ==
In November 2015, Coles launched its new "Pick and Pack" System branded "RoverRUSH". It uses the supermarkets shelf layouts to tell Shoppers exactly where the item is located and takes the shopper the most efficient way possible. Before RoverRUSH, shoppers were given sheets of paper to tick off the shopping, this process took longer and was less efficient. All Coles Online Supermarkets were converted to this system and Rover was sold to US Software & Hardware Company NCR.
