= Megamart =

Australian furniture and electrical goods chain

- Megamart logo
- Type: Subsidiary
- Industry: Retail
- Founded: 1998; 28 years ago
- Defunct: 2005
- Number of locations: 9 stores (2005)
- Parent: Coles Myer

Megamart was an Australian chain of stores owned by Coles Myer that sold electrical goods and furniture. It was co-branded with Coles Myer's department store chain Myer.

== History ==
In September 1998, Coles Myer opened the first Megamart store in Coorparoo, Queensland. By April 2001, there were three stores. At its peak in 2005, the chain had nine stores: four in Victoria, three in New South Wales, one in Queensland and one in Western Australia.

In November 2005, Coles Myer announced it would shut down the Megamart business due to poor performance. According to business reporter Stephen McMahon, Megamart failed as "its small footprint meant it struggled to compete with rivals such as Harvey Norman and Dick Smith - while cannibalising Myer's own sales."

All nine Megamart stores stopped trading on 13 November 2005. Six store locations were bought out by Harvey Norman and reopened as Harvey Norman stores. The remaining three were bought by Clive Peeters (which was soon purchased by Harvey Norman itself).

== See also ==
- Mitre 10 Mega
- Big W
