= Royal Agricultural Society of Western Australia =

Agricultural society in Western Australia

The Royal Agricultural Society of Western Australia (RASWA) was established 1831 in Western Australia.

== Early history ==
It held its first annual agricultural show, the Fair and Cattle Show, at Guildford on 7 November 1834.

The show was moved to the Claremont Showground in 1905, when it became the Perth Royal Show.

In 1907, a range of other agricultural societies merged. Despite the action, separate agricultural societies remain throughout the state.

== Agricultural Hall of Fame ==
In 1999 the Agricultural Hall of Fame was established by the Society, to honour "the men and women who have significantly contributed to Western Australian agriculture and pastoral life." Each year since then (other than 2016), inductees have been chosen by a selection panel (after being nominated by members of the public) and has had their portraits commissioned and hung in David Buttfield House at Claremont Showground. The Hall of Fame was established after then-President, Lou Giglia, visited the Canadian Agricultural Hall of Fame and was inspired by Peggy Knapp, the president of that organisation, to start a similar programme in Western Australia. David Buttfield House was refurbished, and the collection of portraits are on permanent display. The gallery is open to the public during the Royal Show, and at select other times during the year.

The RASWA, as it has also been known, has survived substantial change in agriculture and agricultural practices in Western Australia in its history, and was able to celebrate with the publication of a book detailing this history in 2004.

== Publications ==
=== Newsletter ===
- Showtalk WA: official newsletter of the Royal Agricultural Society of Western Australia, 1988–2001
- RASWA link: official newsletter of the Royal Agricultural Society of Western Australia, 2002–2018

=== Catalogues and rules ===
- Catalogues (1899–2002), minutes, list of judges, programmes (1965–1971)
- Rules of the Royal Agricultural Society of Western Australia, 1921
- The Royal Agricultural Society of Western Australia (Incorporated) rules, 1951
- RASWA Agricultural Hall of Fame Inductees 1999–2018

== Hall of Fame Inductees ==
- 1999: James Drummond(1787-1863)
- 2000: Charles Harper, Walter Harper, Marjorie Winifred Leslie Lewis BEM (1906–1992), Eric Underwood (1905-1980), Dr John Sylvester Gladstones AM (1932–), and Sir Donald Payze Eckersley OBE (1922–2009)
- 2001: Maud Dempster (1861–1953), Harry Walter Gayfer AM (1925–), Friederich Wilhelm Gustar Liebe (1862–1950), Sir Ernest Thorley Loton (1895–1973), Eric Smart, John Teasdale, Reginald John Moir AO (1918–2004), Euphemia Mackintosh (1826–1921)
- 2002: Harold William Bennetts (1898-1970), Rica Erickson (1908-2009), Percival Dicey Forrest OBE (1889–1960), Peter Bruce Lefroy (1916–1999), William Colin Kennedy Pearse CBE (1911–2001), Laurence Cecil Snook (1909–1998)
- 2003: Jane Swain Adams, Basil Embry, Sir Edward Henry Bruce Lefroy (1887–1966), Harry Perkins (1939-2002)
- 2004: George Henry Burvill (1908–1992), Diana Madeline Cullen (1923–2003), Basil Eric Ripp (1927–2009), John Thomson, Thomas Henry Wilding (1867–1954)
- 2005: Jack Mann (1906–1989), Joze Zekulich (1907–2014), Dr George Lowe Sutton CMG (1872–1964)
- 2006: Dr Henry Paul Schapper (1918–2010), Edgar Noel Fitzpatrick AM (1929–), Kevin Patrick Hogan OAM (1933–)
- 2007: Claude Roderick Cyril Toop (1901–1969), Dr John Gojko Radunovich OAM (1932–2014), James Harcourt Jim Shepherd AO (1927–2014)
- 2008: Peter Mckenzie Falconer OAM (1932–), Clive Vincent Malcolm (1933–2006), Warren Marwich (1869–1955)
- 2009: Gregory William Henderson (1929–), Robert Bryce Hays-Thompson BEM OAM MDM (1921–2018), William Padbury (1867–1951)
- 2010: Janette Floyd Foulkes-Taylor OAM (1940–), John Ernest Lane Cripps (1927–), Leslie Charles Eric Hitchcock (1926–2015), George Rex Edmondson (1937–)
- 2011: Hartley Teakle, Ernie Bridge, John Bennison
- 2012: Luigi Alexander Giglia (1940–2018), David Roy Lindsay (1937–), Nicolas Trandos OAM (1934–)
- 2013: Walter Padbury, Rosendo Salvado
- 2014: Clive Macdonald Francis (1938–2012), Dawson Stanley Bradford (1944–)
- 2015: Michael John Lloyd (1942–)
- 2016: No inductee.
- 2017: Peter James Trefort (1945–)
- 2018: Alan David Robson (1945–), Eric Farleigh (1898–1988)
- 2019: Ray Harrington (1947–)
- 2020: Ray Owen (1905–2003)
- 2021: Graham Crosbie
