= Harry Perkins Institute of Medical Research =

Healthcare organization in Perth, Western Australia

The Harry Perkins Institute of Medical Research is a medical research centre based in Perth, Western Australia. It has facilities at the Queen Elizabeth II Medical Centre in Nedlands and Fiona Stanley Hospital in Murdoch. Established in 1998 as the Western Australian Institute for Medical Research (WAIMR), it was renamed in 2013 in honour of its founding chairman, Harry Perkins.

== History ==
The Western Australian Institute for Medical Research (WAIMR) was established in 1998 as a collaboration between the University of Western Australia (UWA), Royal Perth Hospital, and Sir Charles Gairdner Hospital. Fremantle Hospital became a partner in 2003. The institute was an initiative of two UWA professors, Peter Klinken and Peter Leedman, with Klinken becoming its first director. Harry Perkins, the chairman of Wesfarmers, played a key role in its establishment and was appointed as the institute's first chairman, a position he held until his death in 2002. Wesfarmers provided an initial donation of A$5 million, equivalent to A$9.4 million in 2022, and has been the institute's major sponsor ever since. In October 2013, WAIMR changed its name to honour Perkins' legacy.

== Facilities ==
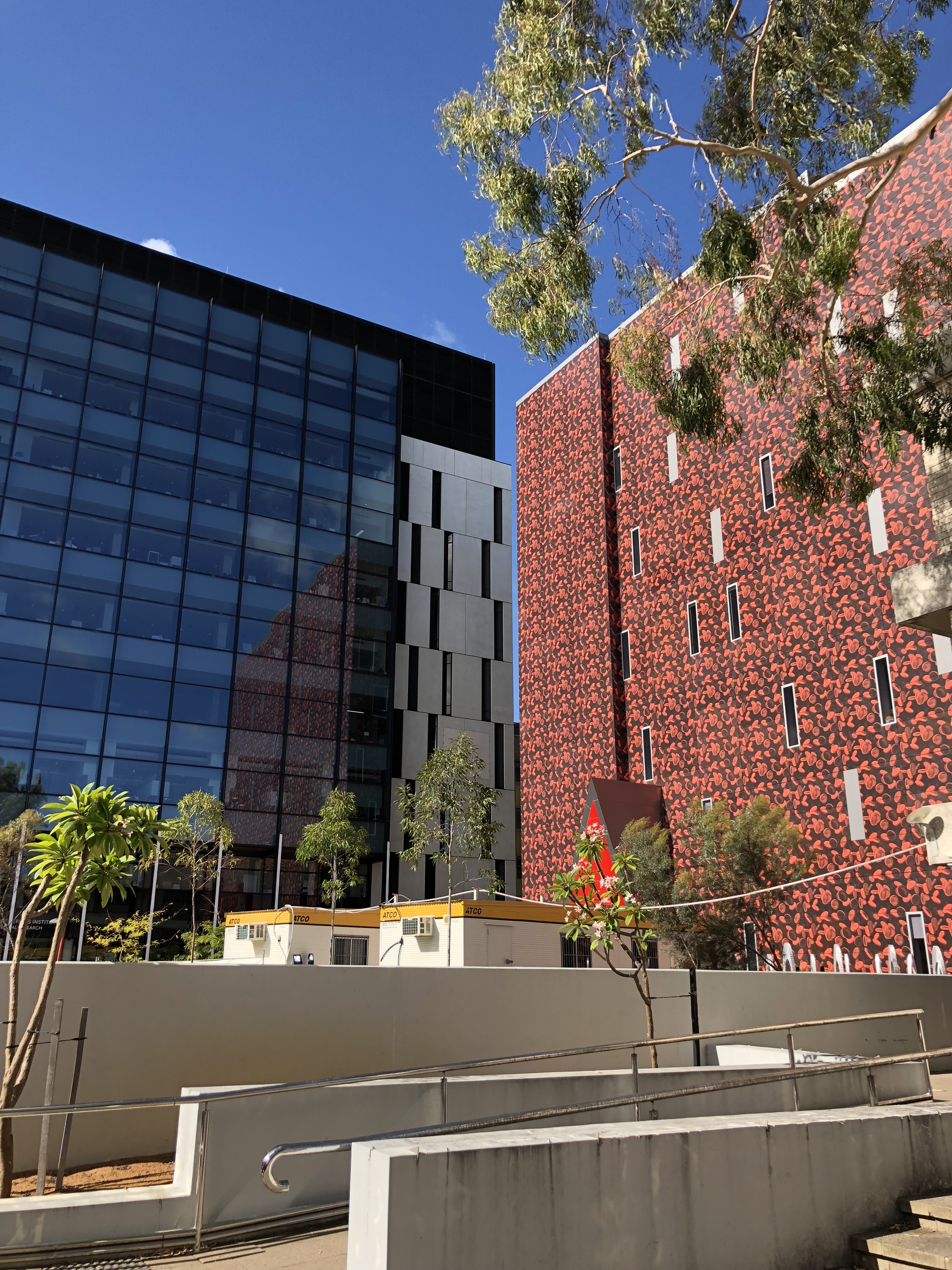
Building at Queen Elizabeth II Medical Centre

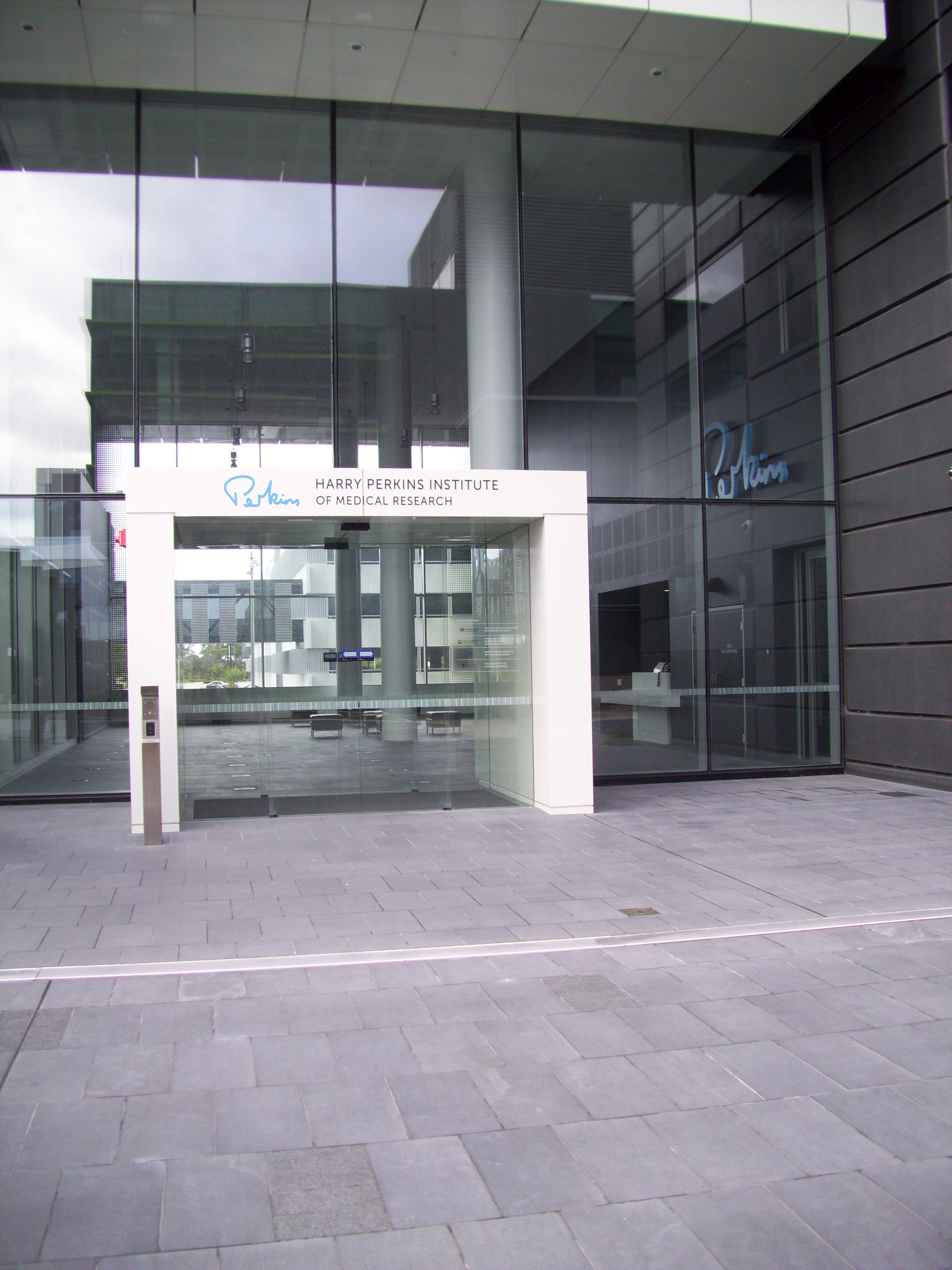
Entrance at Fiona Stanley Hospital

The institute was originally housed in existing space at the Queen Elizabeth II Medical Centre. In March 2014, the institute moved into a new purpose-built 10-storey building at 31°58′05″S 115°48′50″E on the same site, which cost A$122 million, equivalent to A$146.4 million in 2022, and was funded by the state and federal governments and private-sector contributions. The new building (known as Perkins North) has a capacity of 750 researchers. In late 2014, a second facility (known as Perkins South) was opened at 32°04′16″S 115°50′40″E on the new Fiona Stanley Hospital site, a six-storey building costing A$63.5 million, equivalent to A$76.2 million in 2022. It can accommodate up to 363 research and academic staff.
