= Sigma Healthcare =

Australian pharmaceutical wholesale and retail company

Sigma Healthcare Limited
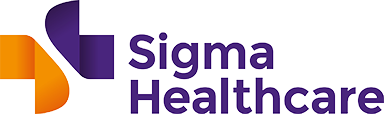
- Type: Public
- Traded as: ASX: SIG
- Industry: Pharmaceuticals
- Founded: 1912; 114 years ago in Melbourne, Australia
- Headquarters: Preston, Victoria, Australia
- Area served: Australia
- Key people: Michael Sammells (Chairman); Vikesh Ramsunder (CEO & Managing Director)
- Products: Prescription, over-the-counter and generic pharmaceutical products
- Revenue: ▲ A$4.84 billion (2025)
- Net income: ▲ A$281.3 million (2025)
- Number of employees: 1200
- Subsidiaries: Amcal; Chemist Warehouse; Discount Drug Stores; Pharmasave Australia; MPS; NostraData Pty Ltd (51% owned)
- Website: sigmahealthcare.com.au

Sigma Healthcare Limited is an Australian, ASX-listed company with a focus on the pharmacy industry. The company has pharmacy operations in retail, wholesale and distribution. From its head office in Preston, Victoria, Sigma manages over 1,200 branded and independent pharmacies. Sigma Healthcare owns Australian retail pharmacy brands: Amcal, Chemist Warehouse and Discount Drug Stores. The company also has a presence in the hospital pharmacy services, contract logistics, dose administration aids and other healthcare service adjacencies.

== History ==
Sigma Co. Ltd was established in Melbourne in 1912, by Ernest Leete and Thomas Church, with the endorsement of the South Suburban Chemists’ Association. The impetus for such a move was driven by the high costs of wholesale drugs and medicines at the time, and Leete and Church set about manufacturing their own products for sale exclusively by members of the association. Established as a company to be funded by member subscriptions, initial interest from pharmacists was lukewarm, however Leete and Church persisted with their manufacturing plans. By the end of the first year however, the venture had attracted over two hundred subscribers, who agreed to the formation of a company owned by shareholders.

Sigma Company Limited was formally registered on 13 October 1913.

Over the course of the next 80 years, Sigma continued to expand its operations and develop into new markets, including exports into the Asia-Pacific and the Middle East. By 1992, Sigma owned assets of $180 million, saw group sales turnover of $600 million and employed more than a thousand people.

By the end of the 20th century, Sigma had purchased the Guardian and Amcal retail pharmacy brands, and in 1999 listed on the Australian Securities Exchange as Sigma Pharmaceuticals Limited.

On 3 May 2017, Sigma board of directors and shareholders voted on a change of name to Sigma Healthcare Limited. The now-publicly listed company also changed its ASX ticker from SIP to SIG at this time.

In December 2023, Chemist Warehouse Group announced its intention to merge with Sigma Healthcare through a reverse takeover.

== Mergers and acquisitions ==
In 2010, Sigma Pharmaceutical restructured and sold its generic drug manufacturing business to South Africa’s Aspen Pharmacare for AUD$804 million, ending an almost 100-year legacy in the manufacturing field for the company. The pharmaceuticals division included generic brands, over-the-counter medications, its Herron brand, ethical products, medical products and the manufacturing businesses.

In March 2014, Sigma acquired the healthcare product wholesaler and distributor Central Healthcare Services in a deal worth $24.5 million.

In September 2014, the company bought the Queensland-based Discount Drug Store (DDS) banner for $26.7 million. The DDS acquisition was set to add 120 pharmacies under that brand to the Sigma network.

In 2017, partly in response to Australian Government changes to pharmacists’ payments under the Pharmaceutical Benefits Scheme, Sigma diversified further, acquiring Medication Packaging Systems (MPS), Australia's largest provider of dose administration services to the aged care sector and community pharmacy patients.

During the 2020 COVID-19 pandemic, Sigma announced that it had sold the land and buildings of its distribution centres in Queensland and New South Wales, under an agreement to lease the facilities back from the new owners for an initial term of 15 years.

The following year, Sigma launched a bid for Australian Pharmaceutical Industries, which owned a number of rival retail pharmacy brands including Priceline, Pharmacist Advice and Soul Pattinson Chemists. The proposed merger, valued at AUD$773.5 million, was however withdrawn on 5 October 2021, with Australian retail conglomerate Wesfarmers, announcing its purchase of 19.3% of API’s shares of API two days later. On 11 February 2022, the Australian Competition & Consumer Commission announced that it will not oppose the proposed acquisition of API by Wesfarmers.

In September 2022 Sigma announced that it planned to consolidate its retail brands and focus franchise growth under the Amcal and Discount Drug Store brands.

On 13 February 2025, Sigma Healthcare merged with the Chemist Warehouse Group and have new shares trading on the ASX.

== Financial performance ==
The Group reported net profit after tax (NPAT) attributable to owners of the company for the year ended 31 January 2021 of $59,761,000 which was up $72,091,000 from the prior period ($12,330,000 loss). Reported earnings before interest, tax, depreciation and amortisation (EBITDA) of $94,198,000 was up 289.2% on the prior period ($24,200,000).

== Controversies ==
In 2010, Sigma shares were placed in a trading halt on the Australian Securities Exchange – initially due to a profit warning. Since then, allegations of accounting irregularities and preferential deals negotiated with certain pharmacy chains (at the expense of smaller independent chemists) that left Sigma losing money at the expense of their own Amcal and Guardian Pharmacies banners and forsaking cashflow emerged. The trading halt was lifted later that year. The events resulted in the initiation of a shareholder class action before the Federal Court of Australia.
