= Harry Perkins =

Australian academic administrator (1939–2002)

Charles Henry Perkins
- Born: 5 August 1939
- Died: 14 December 2002 (aged 63)
- Occupation: Businessman
- Known for: chairman of Wesfarmers

Charles Henry "Harry" Perkins AO (5 August 1939 – 14 December 2002) was an Australian farmer, businessman, and philanthropist who was best known as the chairman of Wesfarmers from 1986 to 2002. He also served as chancellor of Curtin University and helped establish the Western Australian Institute for Medical Research, which was later renamed the Harry Perkins Institute of Medical Research in his honour.

== Early life and family ==
Perkins was born to a farming family in Bruce Rock, Western Australia. His father, Charles Collier Perkins, had moved there from Victoria in the 1920s and was also involved with Wesfarmers; he was later elected to state parliament and became a government minister. Perkins was educated at Geelong Grammar School, which his father had also attended. He then returned to Bruce Rock to run the family farm in his father's absence. In 1972, Perkins was awarded a Nuffield Farming Scholarship, which allowed him to spend six months in Europe on a study tour. He subsequently became one of the first farmers in his districts to employ chemical weed control and no-till farming techniques.

== Business career ==
Perkins was appointed to the board of Wesfarmers in 1975, at a time when it was still organised along the lines of a farmers' cooperative. The company was publicly listed in 1984, after a push from general manager John Bennison. Perkins retained his place on the board, and in 1986 succeeded Sir Marcus Beeck (deceased) as chairman. His period as the head of the board was marked by massive growth and expansion, as Wesfarmers diversified into the industrial conglomerate that it is today. Perkins resigned from Wesfarmers in December 2002, having suffered a decline in health due to an aggressive form of lung cancer, despite being a non-smoker. He died the day after his resignation. Michael Chaney, Wesfarmers' managing director, said his chairmanship was "marked by the teamwork and harmony he was able to create and maintain". He was succeeded by Trevor Eastwood as chairman of the Wesfarmers Board.

== Community service and philanthropy ==
Perkins served on the Bruce Rock Shire Council as a councillor and deputy president. He had a long-standing involvement with the Nuffield Foundation (particular its scholarship programme), and served as an advisor to the federal government's Cooperative Research Centres programme. In 1997, Perkins was appointed chancellor of Curtin University – a position he held until his death. Around the same time, he was involved in the establishment of the Western Australian Institute for Medical Research. He organised a $5-million donation from Wesfarmers, and in 1998 became its inaugural chairman. In 2013, the organisation was renamed the Harry Perkins Institute of Medical Research in his honour.

In the 2001 Australia Day Honours, Perkins was made an Officer of the Order of Australia (AO), "for service to primary industry, particularly as a leader and researcher in farm management practices and the new utilisation of grain, to tertiary education, and to the community".
