= Wesfarmers =

Australian conglomerate

Wesfarmers Limited
- Trade name: Wesfarmers
- Type: Public
- Traded as: ASX: WES; S&P/ASX 200 component
- Industry: Conglomerate
- Founded: 1914; 112 years ago
- Headquarters: Perth, Western Australia, Australia
- Number of locations: 1,933 stores (2024)
- Area served: Australia; India; Ireland; New Zealand
- Key people: Michael Chaney (Chairman); Rob Scott (CEO)
- Revenue: ▲$45.7 billion (2025)
- Net income: ▲$2.926 billion (2025)
- Total assets: ▲$27.981 billion (2025)
- Number of employees: 118,000 (2025)
- Subsidiaries: Bunnings Group: Bunnings, Bunnings Trade, Tool Kit Depot, Beaumont Tiles; Kmart Group: Kmart, Target; Wesfarmers Chemicals, Energy & Fertilisers: CSBP, CSBP Ammonia, Ammonium Nitrate and Industrial Chemicals, CSBP Fertilisers, Australian Vinyls, Australian Gold Reagents (75%), Queensland Nitrates (50%), Evol LNG, Kleenheat, Covalent Lithium (50%); Officeworks: Officeworks, Geeks2U; Wesfarmers Industrial and Safety: Blackwoods, NZ Safety Blackwoods, Coregas, Workwear Group; Health: Australian Pharmaceutical Industries, Priceline and Priceline Pharmacy, Clear Skincare, Soul Pattinson Chemist, Club Premium, Pharmacist Advice, Pharmacy Best Buys; Catch; OneDigital: OnePass; Other: flybuys (50%), BWP Trust (25%), Gresham Partners (50%), Wespine Industries (50%)
- Website: wesfarmers.com.au
- Footnotes; Subsidiaries according to the Wesfarmers 2025 Annual Report

Wesfarmers Limited is an Australian conglomerate, headquartered in Perth, Western Australia. It has interests predominantly in Australia and New Zealand, operating in retail, chemical, fertiliser, industrial and safety products. With revenue of A$45.7 billion in the 2025 financial year, it is one of Australia's largest companies by revenue. Wesfarmers is also one of the largest private employers in Australia, with approximately 118,000 employees.

Wesfarmers was founded in 1914 as a co-operative to provide services and merchandise to Western Australian farmers. It was listed on the Australian Securities Exchange in 1984 and grew into a major retail conglomerate.

== History ==
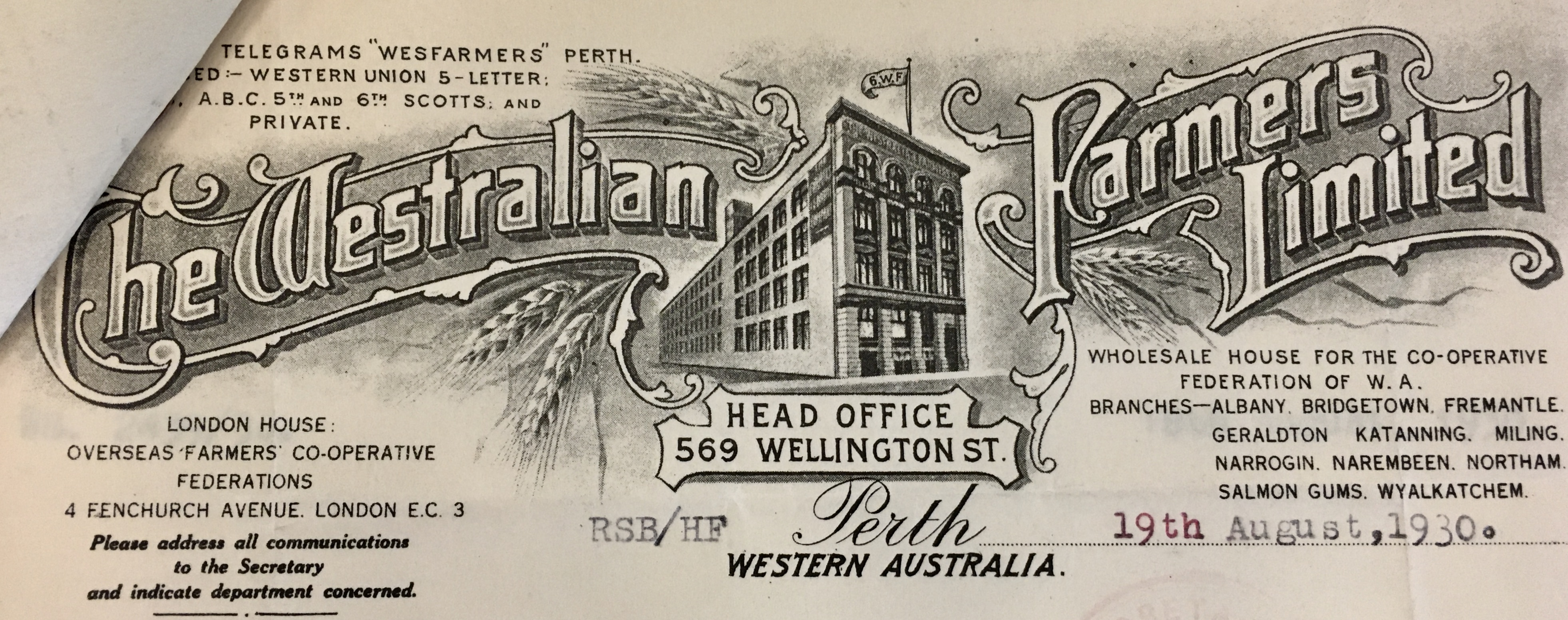
1930s letterhead with company details of that time

Westralian Farmers Co‐operative Limited was formed in 1914 as a cooperative company by the Farmers' and Settlers' Association of Western Australia, to acquire the assets of the West Australian Producers' Union, to be focused on the provision of services and merchandise to the Western Australian rural community. The word "Westralian" is a portmanteau of "western" and "Australian". By 1919, more than 65 local co-operative companies were acting as agents for Westralian Farmers Limited. In 1924, it established the first public radio station in Western Australia with 6WF, before it passed into the hands of the Australian Broadcasting Commission in 1929, now called ABC Radio Perth

The organisation was linked with the activities of the Co-operative Federation of Western Australia.

By the 1940s, the company's business included "being wheat and general merchants; country distribution for Commonwealth Oil Refineries; wool, livestock, skin and produce auctioneers; grain & fruit exporters; insurance underwriters; acquiring agents for the wheat pool of W.A. Known as Westralian Farmers Limited, it had premises in various locations within the Perth central business district. In the 1940s the company had premises at 563-571 Wellington Street. It also had premises in Newman Street in Fremantle.

In 1949, Wesfarmers acquired Ashburton Transport, which at the time was lossmaking. The following year it also acquired its major competitor Gascoyne Trading Company, combining the operations of the two companies to supply the northwest of Western Australia. Along with wool and mail, it carted bananas from Carnarvon to Perth, returning with stores and mail from Perth. Gascoyne Trading introduced refrigerated transport to the region and three trailer road trains that now carry loads up to 115 tonnes.

In 1979, Wesfarmers acquired a controlling interest in CSBP, the successor to Cuming Smith, a Melbourne based fertiliser and chemicals manufacturer established in 1872. The takeover, valued at approximately $60 million, was described at the time as the largest corporate acquisition in Australian history.

In 1984, Westralian Farmers Co-operative Limited formed Wesfarmers Limited, restructuring from a co-operative to a public company and listed on the Australian Securities Exchange on 15 November 1984. Initially the co-operative retained 60% of the ordinary shares, guaranteeing that the co-op's farmer members retained control, and the rest was distributed to its members.

In 1986, Wesfarmers completed the acquisition of CSBP by purchasing BP’s remaining stake, thereby assuming full ownership.

In 1991, 19 m^{3} of the records of Westralian Farmers Co-operative were deposited with the J S Battye Library in Perth.

=== Rural business, Dalgety Farmers and Wesfarmers Landmark ===
Bought in January 1993 the integration of Dalgety Farmers with Wesfarmers proved more difficult than expected. For a time the merged rural agency and merchandise business was Wesfarmers Dalgety until renamed Wesfarmers Landmark in March 2001 after IAMA Limited was brought in. Landmark, Wesfarmers foundation business, was sold to AWB Limited in August 2003.

=== Bunnings ===
An initial investment in 10 percent of Bunnings in February 1987 reached full ownership in January 1994. Bunnings bought UK retailer Homebase in February 2016 and Britain's first Bunnings store opened twelve months later in February 2017. They were 265 well-located stores and Wesfarmers believed Bunnings' management would greatly improve their modest profits. The plan was to make changes gently but tactics changed and local management, perceived as under-performing, was removed and replaced by expatriate management. The expatriate management's changes alienated the existing customer base and, aided by a poor retailing climate, brought a rapid decline into losses. A strategic review by Wesfarmers resulted in the May 2018 sale of the Homebase business to Hilco Capital at a loss of A$1.96 billion.

Despite returning to profitability, Homebase collapsed in 2024, with its stores sold off or closed and the IP sold to CDS Superstores International "The Range".

=== Australian Railroad Group ===
Australian Railroad Group began a joint venture with Genesee & Wyoming by the purchase of Westrail at the beginning of 2000. It was sold in 2006 to Babcock & Brown and Queensland Rail.

=== End of co-operative ownership ===
In 2001, Wesfarmers became a freely-traded publicly listed company with open ownership. After becoming a public company, Wesfarmers diversified its interests by acquiring other businesses.

== Divisions ==
=== Bunnings ===
Bunnings is a retailer of home improvement and outdoor living products, servicing home and commercial customers in Australia and New Zealand. They have 511 locations, including large warehouse stores, smaller format stores and trade centres. Bunnings employs more than 53,000 staff.

In January 2016, Home Retail Group accepted an offer from Wesfarmers to acquire the British home improvement retailer and garden centre Homebase for $704 million. Stores in the United Kingdom and Ireland began to be rebranded as Bunnings following the takeover. However, following Wesfarmer's sale of Homebase to Hilco in May 2018, it was reported that the 24 stores already converted would return to the Homebase branding.

=== Kmart ===
Kmart is a discount department store retailer in Australia and New Zealand. Kmart has 323 stores around Australia and New Zealand, employing approximately 38,000 staff. Kmart Tyre & Auto Service is no longer a part of Kmart after parent Wesfarmers sold the auto division to Continental for $350 million. Kmart Tyre and Auto has since been rebranded by Continental to MyCar.

Target is a mid-level department store retailer in Australia, which operates 124 stores. Target employs more than 10,000 staff. Target Australia has no connection to the American retailer of the same name.

=== Officeworks ===
Officeworks is a retailer and supplier of office products for home, business and education in Australia. It operates 173 stores and employs around 8,800 staff.

In 2019, Officeworks group acquired Geeks2U, an Australian provider of on-site information, communication and technology services.

=== Chemicals, Energy and Fertilisers ===
Wesfarmers Chemicals, Energy & Fertilisers (WesCEF) produces and markets chemicals, fertilisers and gas products. WesCEF employs more than 1,300 staff.

WesCEF has ammonia and ammonium nitrate production facilities in Western Australia, 50% of QNP ammonium nitrate production facilities in Queensland, sodium cyanide production facilities in Western Australia, PVC resin and specialty chemicals production facilities in Victoria, LPG and LNG production facilities in Western Australia and fertiliser production and importation facilities in Western Australia.

WesCEF businesses include CSBP (originally formed from Cuming, Smith & Co. in 1964), Australian Vinyls, AGR (75% stake), QNP (50% stake), Covalent Lithium (50% stake), Kleenheat, Modwood and Evol LNG.

=== Industrial and Safety ===
Wesfarmers Industrial and Safety provides industrial and safety products and services in Australia and New Zealand. It employs 3,100 staff.

On 1 December 2014, Wesfarmers Industrial and Safety completed the acquisition of the Workwear Group of Pacific Brands for $180 million.

Its businesses include Blackwoods (including NZ Safety Blackwoods, Bullivants and Cm3), Workwear Group (including the brands King Gee, Hard Yakka, Stubbies, Bates, Wolverine, Totally Workwear, NNT and Incorporate Wear) and Coregas.

The division's 32 New Zealand stores are now all branded as NZ Safety Blackwoods. These include former Blackwood and Packaging House stores, and 19 former Paykel Engineering Supplies purchased in 2003.

=== Wesfarmers Health ===
Wesfarmers acquired Australian Pharmaceutical Industries (API) in March 2022 for $740 million. API would form the basis of a new healthcare division of Wesfarmers, Wesfarmers Health. They employ around 3,000 staff.

In June 2023, Wesfarmers reached an agreement to buy InstantScripts for $135 million. In late 2024, Wesfarmers Health launched Atomica, a pilot beauty store concept. In June 2025, Wesfarmers Health acquired the Pharmacy 4 Less Group (which operates pharmacies under the Pharmacy 4 Less and Your Chemist Shop brands) after the group went into voluntary administration in April that year.

=== Wesfarmers OneDigital ===
In August 2019, Catch Group, operator of the online shopping website Catch.com.au, was acquired by Wesfarmers for $230 million. On 21 January 2025, Wesfarmers announced that Catch.com.au would cease trading as of 30 April 2025.

=== Other businesses ===
Wesfarmers has 100% interest in many other subsidiaries across Australia, New Zealand, India, New Caledonia, United Kingdom, Hong Kong, Indonesia, China, Bermuda and Singapore. These include BBC Hardware, Fosseys, Howard Smith, Loyalty Pacific, Tyremaster, Viking Direct and World 4 Kids.

=== Other activities ===
Wesfarmers has a 50% interest in investment house Gresham Partners plus interests in Gresham Private Equity Funds, 50% interest in Wespine, a plantation softwood sawmill in Dardanup and a 24% interest in BWP Trust which mainly owns Bunnings Warehouses tenanted by Bunnings Group Limited.

== Former interests ==
=== Insurance ===
On 16 June 2014, Wesfarmers completed the sale of its insurance broking and premium funding operations, including OAMPS Insurance Brokers in Australia, OAMPS UK, Crombie Lockwood in New Zealand, Lumley Finance and Monument Premium Financing to Arthur J. Gallagher & Co. On 30 June 2014, Wesfarmers completed the sale of its insurance underwriting operations, including the WFI and Lumley brands, to the Insurance Australia Group.

=== Coles ===
In November 2007, Wesfarmers completed the purchase of the Coles Group for $22 billion under a scheme of arrangement making it the largest take-over in Australian corporate history.

Coles is a national supermarket, department store, liquor, fuel and convenience retailer in Australia. As of September 2013, Coles operated 756 full-service supermarkets, 810 liquor outlets, 92 hotels, and 636 fuel and convenience stores. Wesfarmers bought Kmart and Target during its purchase of Coles. As at 2015, Coles employed more than 105,000 staff. Coles' businesses included Coles Supermarkets, Coles Online, Coles Express, Vintage Cellars, First Choice Liquor Market, Bi-Lo, Coles Financial Services and Liquorland.

On 16 March 2018, Wesfarmers held a meeting to discuss its intention to spin off Coles. The spin off was effective from 21 November 2018 with Wesfarmers retaining a 15% shareholding. During 2020 Wesfarmers reduced its equity in Coles to 4.9%. In April 2023, Wesfarmers sold off the last of its shares in Coles.

=== Wesfarmers Resources ===
Wesfarmers Resources owned and operated open-cut coal producing resources in Australia including the Curragh in Queensland. Wesfarmers divested its coal business, completing the process with the sale of its 40 per cent interest in the Bengalla Joint Venture to New Hope Corporation for $860 million on 3 December 2018.

=== Wesfarmers Transport ===
In 1950 Wesfarmers purchased the Gascoyne Trading Company (GTC), growing it to become the largest transport operator in Western Australia. Until 1971 it held the sole rights for direct road transport between Carnarvon and Perth. In 1973 a joint venture was formed with Downard to enter the interstate freight forwarding market between Western Australia and Victoria.

In 1985, GTC purchased a 50% shareholding in Total West from Mayne Nickless. In 1996, after taking full ownership of Total West, Wesfarmers merged it with GTC to form Wesfarmers Transport. In 2001 the business was sold to Toll Holdings.

== Company executives ==
Chairmen

- 1914–1916: Deane Hammond
- 1916–1921: Matthew Padbury
- 1921–1953: Walter Harper
- 1953–1965: Ernest Thorley Loton
- 1965–1975: Walter Crosse
- 1975–1982: Maurice Clayton
- 1983–1986: Marcus Beeck
- 1986–2002: Harry Perkins
- 2002–2008: Trevor Eastwood
- 2008–2015: Bob Every
- 2015–present: Michael Chaney

Chief executives / general managers / managing directors

- 1917–1925: Basil Murray
- 1925–1957: John Thomson
- 1958–1973: Keith Edwards
- 1974–1984: John Bennison
- 1984–1992: Trevor Eastwood
- 1992–2005: Michael Chaney
- 2005–2017: Richard Goyder
- 2017–present: Rob Scott
