= Priceline =

Priceline may refer to:

- Priceline.com, a commercial website which helps users obtain discount rates for travel-related items such as airline tickets and hotel stays
- The Priceline Group, a provider of online travel & related services, and a parent company of Priceline.com
- Priceline (Australia), a chain of health and beauty retail stores and pharmacies in Australia, owned by Wesfarmers
