= Chemist Warehouse =

Australian multinational pharmacy retail company

Chemist Warehouse Group

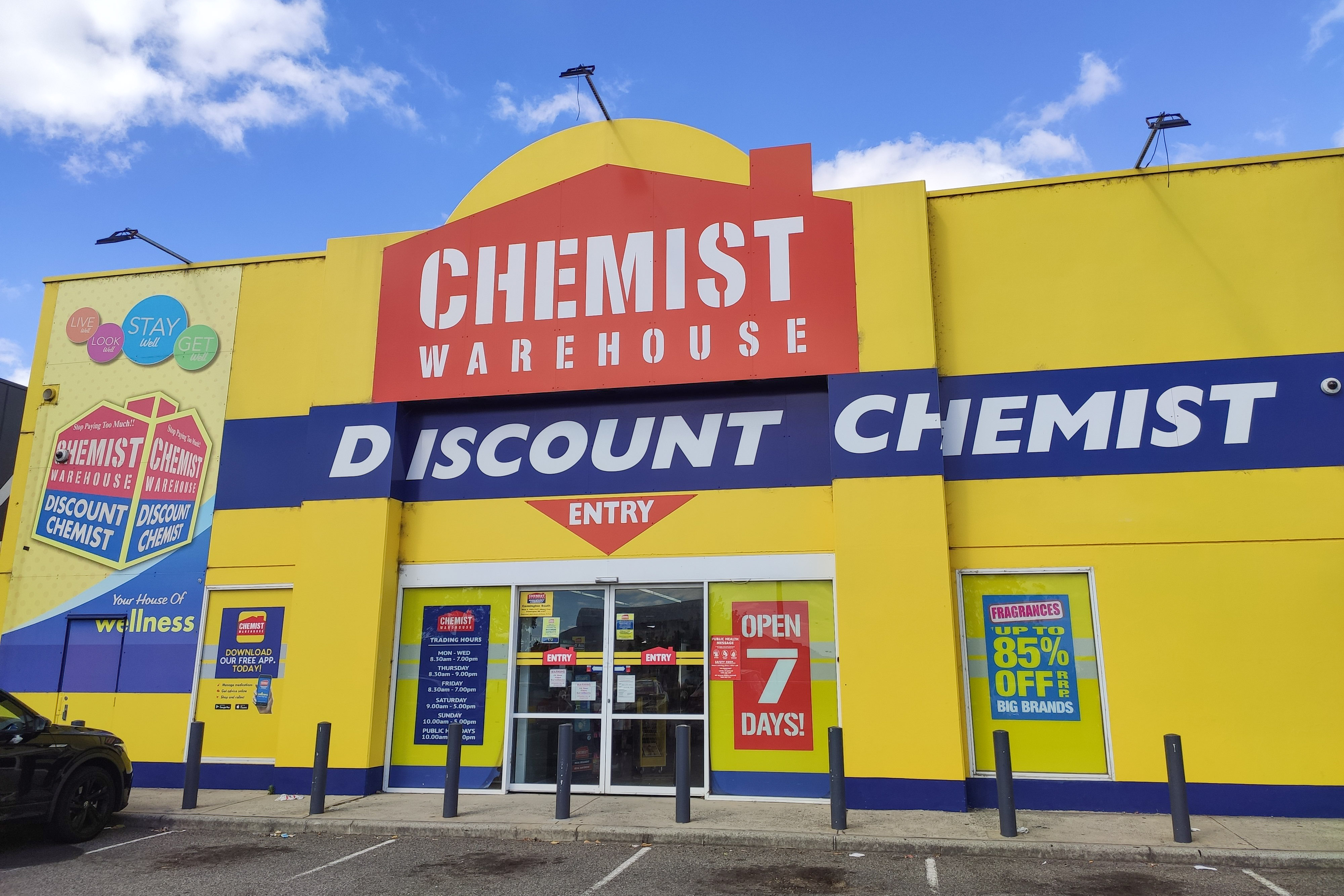
- Chemist Warehouse store in Cannington, Western Australia
- Type: Subsidiary
- Industry: Retail
- Founded: 2000; 26 years ago
- Founders: Jack Gance; Mario Verrocchi
- Headquarters: Preston, Victoria; Australia
- Number of locations: 540+ stores in Australia and New Zealand (2023); 16 stores in Ireland (2025)
- Area served: Australia, New Zealand, Ireland, China, United Arab Emirates, United Kingdom
- Key people: Damien Gance; Mario Tascone
- Products: Pharmacy; health products; supplements; perfume; personal care; baby products; weight loss; cosmetics
- Number of employees: 20,000
- Parent: Sigma Healthcare
- Website: Australia: chemistwarehouse.com.au; New Zealand: chemistwarehouse.co.nz; United Arab Emirates: chemistwarehouse.ae; Ireland: chemistwarehouse.ie

Chemist Warehouse Group is an Australian company operating a chain of retail chemists both locally and internationally. The company is one of Australia's largest retailers with over 500 stores in Australia, and employs over 20,000 staff. The company brands itself as offering discounted prices for pharmaceutical goods.

The company also manages a website and a "click and collect" 24 hour dispense either pick-up and delivery service for medications.

== History ==
The Gance brothers, Jack and Sam, purchased their first chemist in 1972 in the Melbourne suburb of Reservoir. Fresh out of university with a pharmacy degree, Mario Verrocchi, became a trainee under Sam Gance in 1980. The brothers expanded to three locations before leaving the Amcal chain in 1997 and establishing their own brand, My Chemist. In 2000, Jack Gance and Verrocchi founded Chemist Warehouse, opening the first store in Melbourne.

Chemist Warehouse began its international expansion in 2017 with the opening of its first store in New Zealand. This was followed by its entry into Ireland in 2020, China in 2021, and the United Arab Emirates in 2024.

In late 2018, the company launched its Ultra Beauty concept, luxury fragrance and beauty product stores which operate within Chemist Warehouse stores. Chemist Warehouse entered the optometry market in 2023, opening its first Optometrist Warehouse store in Malvern in February. In the second half of 2023, Chemist Warehouse established Chemist Warehouse Hospital Pharmacy, a joint venture with Cathie Reid and Stuart Giles aiming to establish a network of hospital-based pharmacies.

In June 2023, Chemist Warehouse signed a five-year supply contract with Sigma Healthcare. As part of the deal Chemist Warehouse would receive a 10.7 percent stake in Sigma when the contract starts on 1 July 2024. In December 2023, Chemist Warehouse Group announced its intention to merge with Sigma through a reverse takeover. The deal would make Chemist Warehouse a publicly listed company on the ASX. On 13 February 2025, Sigma Healthcare merged with the Chemist Warehouse Group and have new shares trading on the ASX.

In May 2026, Sigma and GreenLight Healthcare agreed to form a joint venture to launch the Chemist Warehouse brand in the United Kingdom. Under the agreement, Sigma licensed the Chemist Warehouse brand and provided retail support while GreenLight provided dispensary services and back-office support. Sigma also acquired a 75 per cent stake in a number of GreenLight stores.

== Business model ==
Chemist Warehouse uses a complex franchise structure to circumvent Australian regulations that limit how many pharmacies a company can operate in any one area. The company's structure allows it to "control" about 400 pharmacies across Australia, and it makes up about 50 percent of the market share. The business model used by Chemist Warehouse is thought to involve minimal equity investment by individual pharmacists who agree to the trading terms enforced across the group. Individual pharmacists working under the Chemist Warehouse umbrella benefit from the bulk purchasing power that comes with being part of the company.

Unlike traditional pharmacies, Chemist Warehouse generates most of its sales from non-prescription products such as vitamins, fragrances, cosmetics and baby formula. Chemist Warehouse also partly owns several brands including Bondi Protein Co, Goat Soap, Barely Intimate Skincare, Bambi Mini and the Wagner supplement brand. It is a shareholder in medical vape manufacturer Liber Pharmaceuticals.

In addition to online shopping through Chemist Warehouse websites, the company trades on several e-commerce marketplaces. It sells to China on Alibaba's Tmall Global and Kaola platforms, and to Southeast Asia on Lazada. The company sold more than A$20 million worth of stock during the first seven hours of Alibaba’s Singles’ Day sale in November 2018. Chemist Warehouse UAE launched their online retail in October 2025, delivering across the UAE with plans to deliver the wider GCC countries in the future.

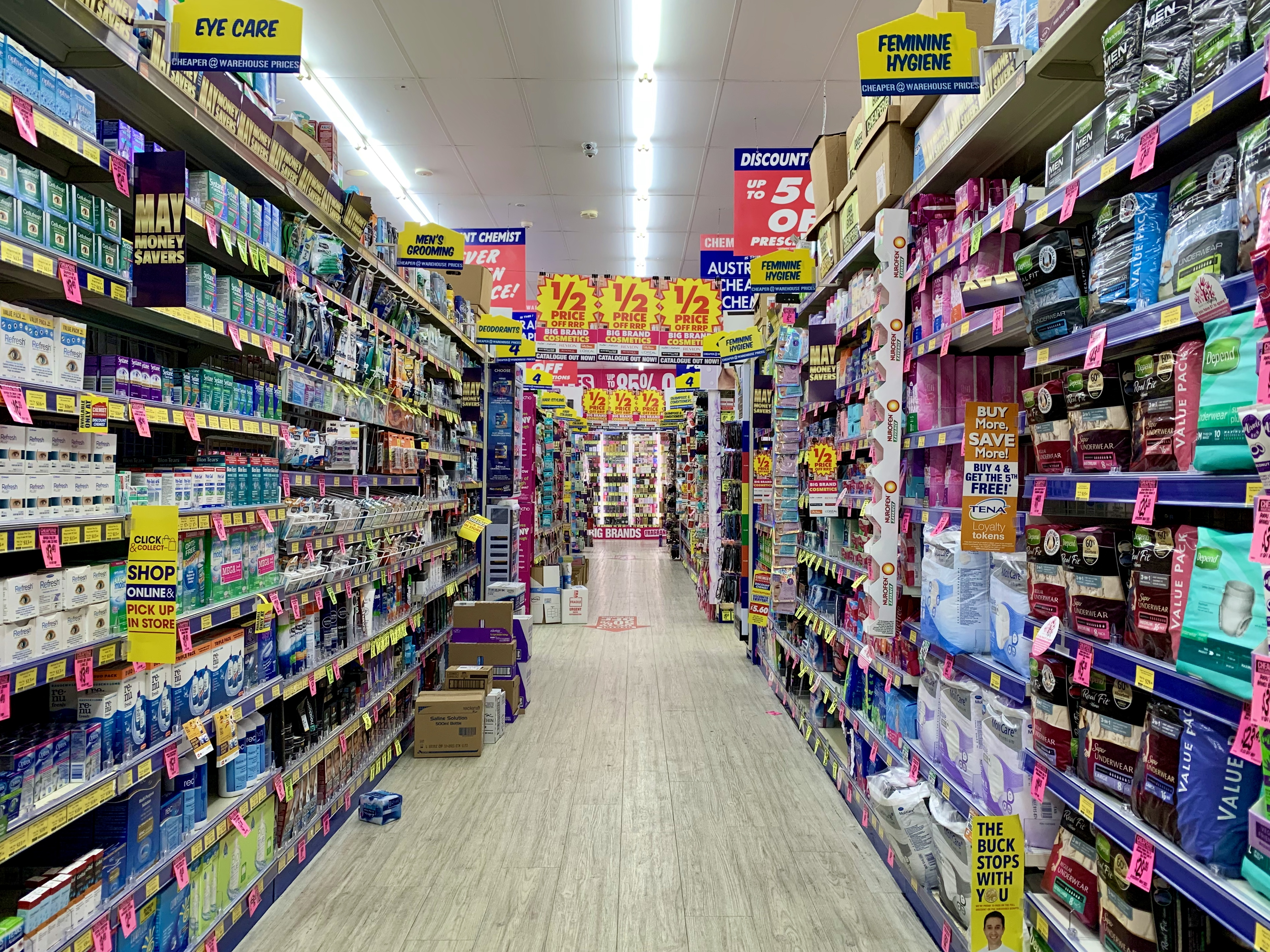
Chemist Warehouse interior Rocklea, Queensland

== Radio ==
The company has a radio station called Chemist Warehouse Remix which broadcasts in stores as well as on DAB+ and the iHeartRadio app. This is run in partnership with the ARN Media and New Zealand Media and Entertainment.

== Controversies ==
The Pharmacy Guild of Australia and pharmacists' union have criticised the company, stating its approach threatens both healthcare standards and employment conditions in the industry. In 2016, Chemist Warehouse was ordered to back-pay almost 6,000 employees a total of over $3.5 million after an audit by the Fair Work Ombudsman. In March 2019, a two-week strike by workers at the company's major distribution centres led to pay rises and a change to the way the company uses labour hire.

In December 2020, Chemist Warehouse's website advertised Fatblaster clinical capsules which had been cancelled from the Australian Register of Therapeutic Goods and was subsequently fined $53,280.
