= Marcus Beeck =

Australian businessman

Sir Marcus Truby Beeck (28 December 1923 – 2 May 1986) was an Australian farmer and businessman. He served as president of the Royal Agricultural Society of Western Australia from 1975 to 1978 and as chairman of Wesfarmers from 1983 until his death.

== Early life ==
Beeck was the son of Martha Ellen (née Keast) and Gustav Edwin Beeck. He was born at the family property in Katanning, Western Australia. Beeck learned by distance education in all but his final year of schooling. He enlisted in the Royal Australian Air Force (RAAF) in May 1942 and trained as a fitter, serving in the Northern Territory, in Borneo, and on Morotai. On his return to Australia, Beeck acquired a sheep and grain property at Coyrecup (just east of Katanning). He married Leonie Robertson in 1950, with whom he would have four children.

== Career ==
=== Community service ===
Beeck served on the Katanning Road Board from 1947 to 1951, and was involved with many local organisations. He was elected as a councillor of the Royal Agricultural Society of Western Australia in 1966, and served as president from 1975 to 1978, overseeing a redevelopment of the Claremont Showground. Beeck accompanied numerous overseas trade missions (often under the auspices of the Department of Overseas Trade), and visited Europe, Japan, the Soviet Union, and Indonesia. Beeck was created a Knight Bachelor in the 1979 Birthday Honours, "in recognition of service to agriculture".

=== Business career ===
Beeck was elected to the board of the Grain Pool of Western Australia in 1969, and served as chairman from 1972 to 1973 and from 1975 to 1977. He was president of the steering committee that arranged for amalgamation of the pool with the barley and seed marketing boards. Beeck was made a director of Wesfarmers in 1977, and then in 1983 succeeded Maurice Clayton as chairman. Wesfarmers was still organised as a farmers' cooperative at that time, but the following year transitioned to a public company and listed on the Australian Stock Exchange. Beeck continued on as chairman until his death from cancer in 1986.

== See also ==
- List of Wesfarmers executives
