= Total West =

Former Western Australian transport company

- Industry: Transport
- Founded: 1 July 1982
- Founder: Mayne Nickless; Westrail
- Defunct: 1996
- Area served: Western Australia
- Owner: Wesfarmers

Total West was a transport company in Western Australia.

== History ==
In 1981, Westrail sough expression of interest to handle small freight traffic. Total West commenced operating on 1 July 1982 as a joint venture between Mayne Nickless and Westrail, each owning 50%. It was formed to transport mail and less than wagon load traffic.

In 1985, Mayne Nickless sold its stake to Gascoyne Trading Company. Gascoyne's 50% stake was included in its sale to Wesfarmers in 1996, who purchased Westrail's stake later the same year. Wesfarmers merged Total West and Gascoyne Trading Company under the Wesfarmers Transport brand. It was included in the 2001 sale of Wesfarmers road transport interests to Toll Holdings.
