= Armaguard =

Australian currency supply chain and technology company

- Formerly: Mayne Nickless Armoured Car Division
- Industry: Logistics
- Founded: September 1938
- Founder: Mayne Nickless
- Headquarters: Essendon Fields, Melbourne, Australia
- Key people: Matt Caulfield (CEO)
- Services: Automated teller machine management Cash movement
- Parent: Linfox
- Website: www.armaguard.com.au

Armaguard is an Australian cash handling company. Founded in 1938 by Mayne Nickless, it is a subsidiary of Linfox.

== History ==
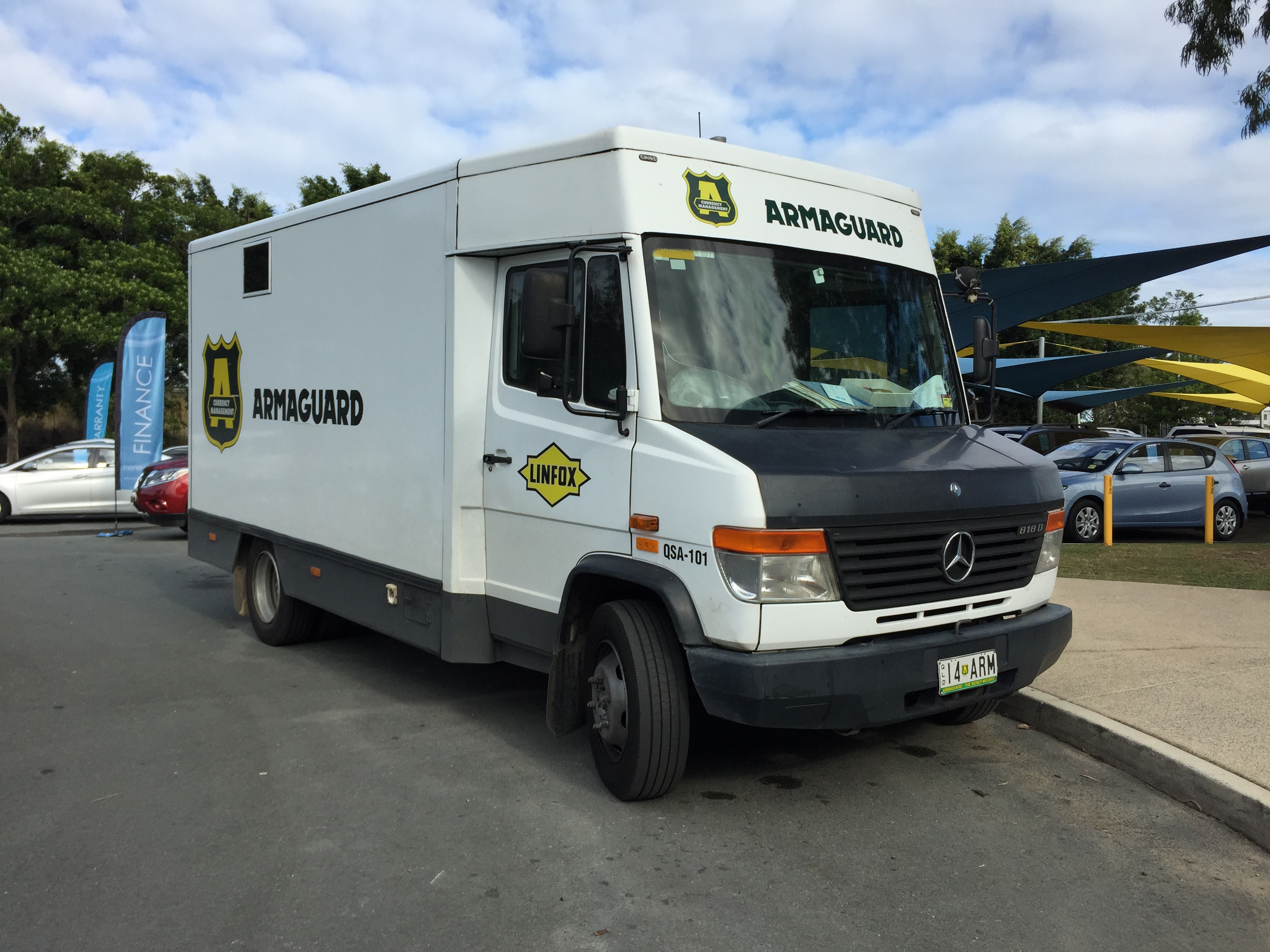
Armaguard Mercedes-Benz Sprinter armoured van in Brisbane in July 2015

Armaguard was founded in September 1938 as the Mayne Nickless Armoured Car Division when Mayne Nickless established an armoured car division in Melbourne. During the 1940s operations began in Sydney, Brisbane, Adelaide and Geelong, followed in the 1950s by Broken Hill, Wollongong and Morwell, Hobart and Launceston, then in the 1960s, Canberra, Townsville and Perth. In 1973 the Mayne Nickless Armoured Car Division was rebranded as Armaguard. In October 1987 the armoured car division of TNT was purchased.

In February 2003 Armaguard was purchased by Linfox. In 2009 the New Zealand assets of Chubb were acquired. In 2011 in a joint venture with Etihad Airways, Armaguard Valuables Management is established in the United Arab Emirates. In 2015 Brink's Australian cash in transit business is purchased.

In 2019 the rediATM business was purchased, operations commenced in Thailand and the United Arab Emirates joint venture was dissolved. In July 2022, Armaguard agreed terms with Prosegur to merge their Australian operations. In June 2023 the merger was approved by the Australian Competition & Consumer Commission.
