= John Bennison =

Australian businessman

John Bennison AM OBE (3 July 1924 – 6 May 2017) was an Australian businessman known for his long involvement with Wesfarmers. He began work at the company in 1954, and as managing director from 1974 to 1984 oversaw its transition from a farmers' cooperative to a publicly listed industrial conglomerate.

== Early life ==
Bennison was born in Mandalay, Burma, to Arthur and Doris Bennison. He lived in Burma until he was a teenager, when he was sent to Perth, Western Australia, to board at Hale School. Bennison completed his secondary education in 1941, and then went on to Perth Technical College. In 1943, however, he enlisted in the Royal Australian Air Force (RAAF). He trained as a pilot at the No. 4 Service Flying Training School in Geraldton, and during the war flew Avro Lancasters. At his discharge in 1946, he held the rank of flying officer.

== Business career ==
After the war's end, Bennison and his new wife initially settled in Armidale, New South Wales, where he studied agriculture at the New England University College. They later moved to Melbourne, where he got a job with Wrigley's, the chewing gum manufacturer. In 1953, Bennison returned to Perth to work for Kraft.

=== Wesfarmers ===
In 1954, at the suggestion of his father-in-law, Bennison placed an advertisement in The West Australian offering his services to "any suitable employer". Keith Edwards, the assistant general manager of Wesfarmers, saw his notice, and after a brief interview offered him a job as a "one-man budgetary control department". Bennison's contributions impressed the company's management, and in 1958 he was put in charge of the company's new Kleenheat Gas division. In that capacity, he helped negotiate a partnership with Air Liquide.

After heading up Kleenheat, Bennison spent periods as head of the industrials division and as assistant general manager. On 1 January 1974, he succeeded Keith Edwards, the man who had first hired him, as Wesfarmers' general manager. Bennison was only the fourth chief executive since the company's foundation in 1917. When he took over, Wesfarmers was still organised along the lines of a farmers' cooperative. It had highly diversified interests, but had weak cash flows and lacked the capital reserves needed for growth.

In 1977, Bennison had Wesfarmers make a takeover bid for CSBP, a large fertiliser company. When the sale finally went through in 1979, it was the largest corporate takeover in Australian history. CSBP was sold for $60 million, which was three times the official value of Wesfarmers itself. According to Bennison, "They had great cash flow and we were shrinking. That was the crux of it. The combination of CSBP and Wesfarmers was magic. You had something you never had – money around the clock".

In the last years of tenure, Bennison determined that it was in Wesfarmers' best interests to float as a public company. He met strong opposition from the board of directors, but eventually had his way, and an initial public offering was made in November 1984. Bennison retired five months earlier, in June 1984, and was replaced by Trevor Eastwood, whom he had hired as a cadet engineer in 1963. He was also responsible for hiring Eastwood's successor, Michael Chaney.

== Personal life ==
During the war, Bennison met Joyce Brearley, the daughter of the famous aviation pioneer Sir Norman Brearley. The two were married in 1946, and had four children together. Bennison enjoyed trout fishing, and had a collection of vintage cars. He was keenly interested in art, and initiated the Wesfarmers Collection, which is now one of the largest private collections of Australian art. Bennison was created an Officer of the Order of the British Empire (OBE) in 1981, for "service to primary industry", and was made a Member of the Order of Australia (AM) in 2008, for "service to business, particularly in the primary industry sector through the promotion and development of commercial opportunities for farmers, and to the arts".
