= Green Cross Health =

New Zealand health care services company

Green Cross Health is a provider of primary health care services around New Zealand, including pharmacies and medical clinics. It is based in Ellerslie, Auckland.

The company is publicly listed on the New Zealand Stock Exchange (NZX : GXH). It provides support to 345 Life and Unichem pharmacies throughout New Zealand, with equity in around a quarter of them. It also has a Medical Division, which provides complete family healthcare services through GP and accident and medical centers, with most operating under the brand of "The Doctors". The company has 63 medical centres throughout New Zealand.

In February 2023, Green Cross struck a deal to sell its Access Community Health business to Anchorage Capital Partners for US$31 million.

== Brands ==
=== Unichem ===
Unichem is a pharmacy franchise selling a range of medications, skincare, cosmetics, gifts and other products. It has 287 stores, including 111 in Auckland.

Unichem was established in 1981 as a buying group for pharmacies. It launched Life pharmacies in 1995 and Dispensary First pharmacies in 1999. In 2003, it merged with the Amcal group and became Pharmacybrands. After a number of acquisitions and other corporate changes, Pharmacybrands was renamed Green Cross Health in 2014.

=== Life Pharmacy ===
Life Pharmacy (sometimes stylised as "life Pharmacy") is a pharmacy chain selling a wide selection of cosmetics and skincare, alongside medications, natural health products and gifts.

The chain was launched as Unichem Life in 1995, and had 21 stores in 2004.

There are now 65 stores, including 23 in Auckland.
