= RediATM =

Australian ATM network

rediATM's logo

The rediATM network was an Australian ATM network originally operated and owned by Cuscal. On 14 August 2019, Cuscal sold the network to the Armaguard who subsequently closed the network by merging with its atmx network.

== History ==
- 1982 – RediTeller ATM network launched to support Australian credit unions
- 2008 – Cuscal and its partners began rebranding RediTeller ATMs to rediATM
- 2009 – National Australia Bank joins the rediATM network, combining NAB's network of 1,700 ATMs with Cuscal's network of 1,400 ATMs
- 2010 – Bank of Queensland joins the rediATM network
- 2017 – Suncorp joins rediATM network
- 2018 – National Australia Bank announces it will discontinue using the rediATM network from 1 January 2019
- 2019 – Armaguard finalises Cuscal rediATM Scheme acquisition on 14 August 2019
- 2021 – Network was closed and merged with atmx

== Partnered financial institutions (before network closure) ==
After a large number of members withdrawing over the years from the network, only the following financial institutions remained partners after the rediATM network closure:

- Bank of Queensland
- Broken Hill Community Credit Union
- Central Murray Credit Union
- Central West Credit Union
- BNK Banking Corporation (Goldfields Money)
- Goulburn Murray Credit Union
- Horizon Bank
- ME Bank
- Orange Credit Union
- Police Bank (NSW)
- Police Credit Union (SA and NT)
- Royal Automobile Club of Queensland
- Bank WAW
- Warwick Gympie Dalby Credit Union
