= Gascoyne Trading Company =

Former transport company in Western Australia

- Industry: Transport
- Founded: 1924
- Founder: Keith Anderson; Charles Kingsford Smith
- Defunct: 1996
- Headquarters: Carnarvon, Western Australia
- Owner: Wesfarmers

Gascoyne Trading Company (GTC) was a transport company in Western Australia. It was established in 1924 by Keith Anderson and Charles Kingsford Smith in Carnarvon. One of its early contracts was the mail run through the Gascoyne to Meekatharra. It expanded to serve industries between Perth and the Pilbara.

GTC was a significant banana deliverer to markets in Perth. In 1950 it was purchased by Wesfarmers growing to become the largest transport operator in Western Australia. Until 1971 it held the sole rights for direct road transport between Carnarvon and Perth. In 1973 a joint venture was formed with Downard to enter the interstate freight forwarding market between Western Australia and Victoria.

In 1985, GTC purchased a 50% shareholding in Total West from Mayne Nickless. In 1996, after taking full ownership of Total West, Wesfarmers merged it with GTC to form Wesfarmers Transport. In 2001 the business was sold to Toll Holdings.
