= Amcal =

Australian pharmacy chain owned by Sigma Healthcare

Amcal Limited

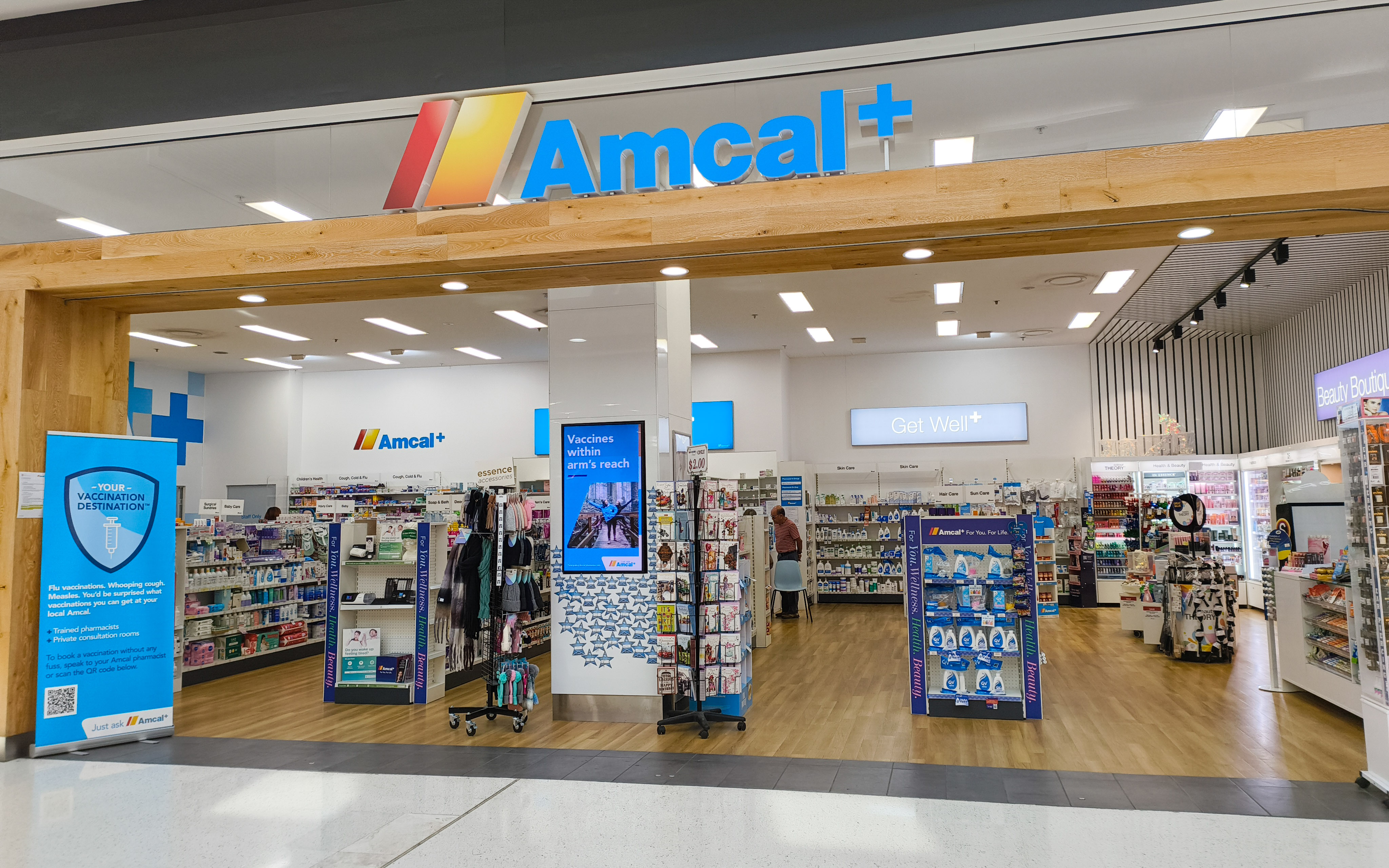
- Amcal store in Westfield Carousel
- Type: Subsidiary
- Industry: Retail
- Founded: 13 July 1937; 89 years ago
- Founder: Major General C. H. Simpson
- Area served: Australia
- Products: Pharmacy
- Parent: Sigma Healthcare
- Website: amcal.com.au

Allied Master Chemists of Australia Limited (Amcal) is an Australian pharmacy retailer. It was founded by Major General C. H. Simpson on 13 July 1937, in a move that greatly influenced the pharmacy industry in Australia. The founding group consisted of 11 pharmacists.

The launch of Amcal to consumers included personal letters to each household, window posters, the give-away of a tablet of soap, and a brochure entitled "Why this is an Amcal Pharmacy".

== Australia ==
Originally, Amcal was a cooperative buying group, owned by its members, who all had shares in the Amcal group. Amcal demutualised when Sigma Pharmaceuticals bought out the members' shares in 2000, with the lure of more money and better centralised marketing. It is still a marketing group, but a franchise division of Amcal, called Amcal Max, is now marketing under a more competitive and compliant model. Between 2016 and 2017, some Amcal pharmacies were converted to Terry White Chemmarts. There are now 223 Amcal pharmacies in Australia.

In September 2022, Sigma announced that it would phase out its Guardian pharmacy brand, with franchisees encouraged to join the Amcal brand by the end of 2023. Following Sigma Healthcare's merger with the Chemist Warehouse Group, Sigma began rebranding more than 20 My Chemist stores to the Amcal brand in March 2025.

== New Zealand ==
In New Zealand, Amcal was a pharmacy franchise. Amcal's marketing was managed by the owner of Amcal New Zealand, Pharmacybrands, a division of Australian Pharmaceutical Industries. The chain was re-branded as Unichem in 2015.

== Loyalty program ==
Amcal's loyalty program, Amcal Rewards, has over 2.4 million members, making it one of the largest retail loyalty programs in Australia.
