= Linfox =

Australian supply chain company

- Type: Private
- Industry: Airports, Logistics, Supply chain
- Founded: 1956
- Founder: Lindsay Fox
- Headquarters: Essendon Fields, Melbourne, Victoria, Australia
- Area served: Australia; Hong Kong; India; Indonesia; Laos; Malaysia; New Zealand; Thailand; Vietnam
- Key people: Dennis Richardson (Chairman); Mark Mazurek (CEO)
- Number of employees: 24,000
- Subsidiaries: Armaguard; Avalon Airport; BevChain; Essendon Airport; K&S Corporation (20%); Luna Park, Melbourne; Phillip Island Grand Prix Circuit
- Website: www.linfox.com

Linfox is an Australian transport, logistics and supply chain business founded in 1956 by Lindsay Fox.

== History ==
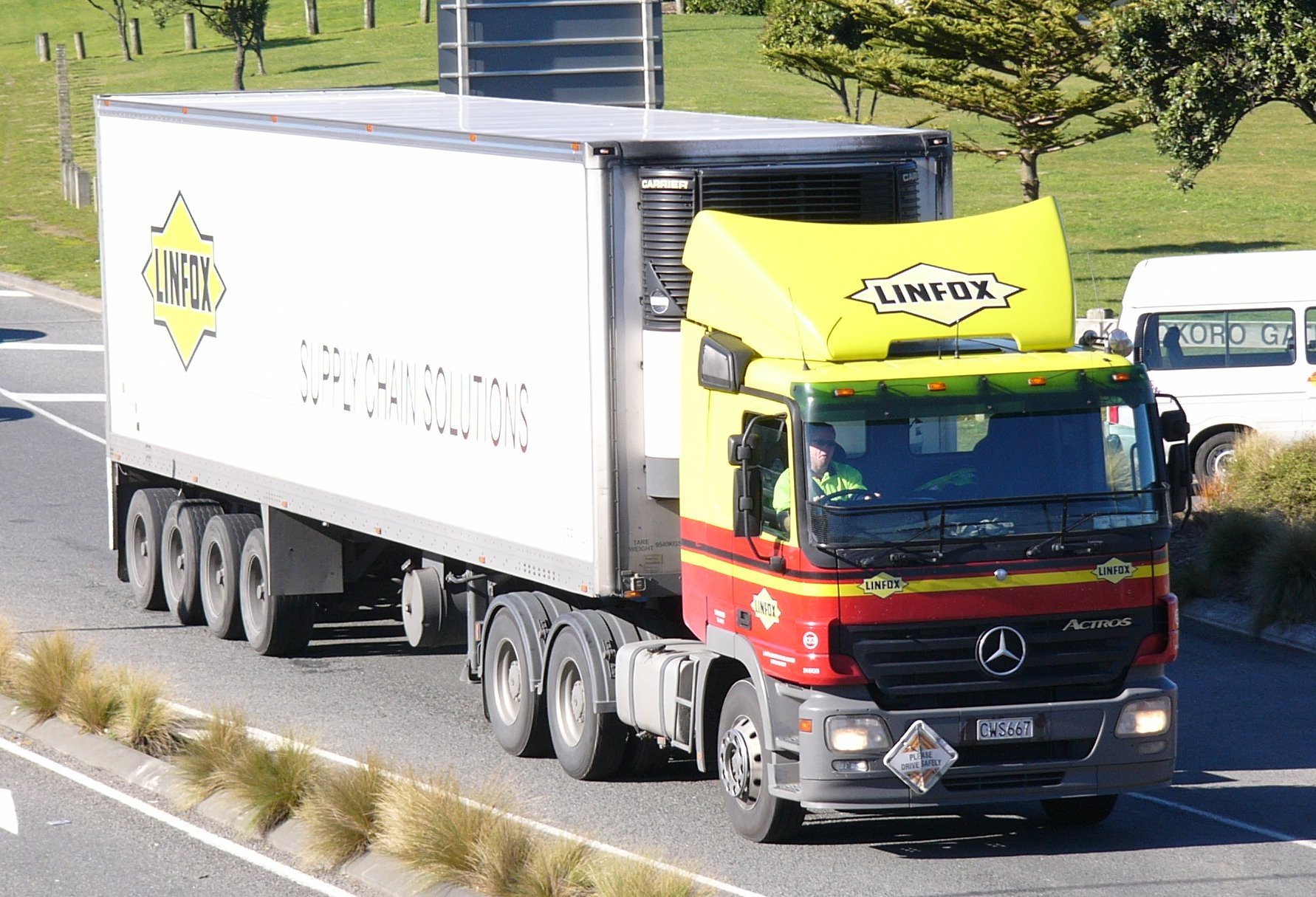
A Linfox truck in New Zealand

Linfox was established in 1956 by Lindsay Fox as Lindsay Fox Cartage with one truck in Melbourne. In 1958, a contract with Schweppes saw the fleet grow to ten trucks. In the early 1960s Lindsay joined with BP to distribute heating oil in Melbourne thus doubling his fleet. By 1966, the fleet comprised over 60 trucks. In the 1970s it expanded into New South Wales and Queensland, operating over 1,000 vehicles by the end of the decade winning notable distribution and warehousing contracts with Coca-Cola, Coles and Woolworths.

In 1984 Linfox commenced operations in Asia with an operation in Shanghai and in 1989 commenced operating in New Zealand. In July 1987, 34% of the company was listed on the Australian Securities Exchange. Lindsay Fox purchased the shares back in 1988.

In 1995, Linfox commenced operations in the United Kingdom for BP. By the end of the 1990s, it operated 3,000 trucks. In 1997 Avalon Airport was purchased followed in 2001 by Essendon Airport.

In 2002, cash-in-transit transport company Armaguard was purchased from Mayne Group. In 2004, the Phillip Island Grand Prix Circuit was purchased. Rail freight forwarder FCL Interstate Transport Services was purchased in August 2006. In 2006 Linfox formed BevChain, a 50:50 joint venture with Lion to provide logistics services to the drinks industry. Linfox took full ownership in 2017.

In 2016, Linfox purchased a 14% shareholding in K&S Corporation, which by January 2019 had increased to 20%.

In February 2019 Aurizon's Queensland intermodal container business was acquired after a previous proposal to acquire it in a joint venture with Pacific National was opposed by the Australian Competition & Consumer Commission. In 2019, Linfox commenced hauling coal in the Illawarra region for South32.
