= Australian Pharmaceutical Industries =

Australian pharmaceutical company

- Type: Subsidiary
- Industry: Health and Beauty
- Founded: 1910; 116 years ago
- Headquarters: Melbourne, Australia
- Number of locations: 795 stores (2024)
- Key people: Emily Amos, Managing Director Wesfarmers Health
- Products: Pharmaceutical, health and beauty
- Services: Wholesale distribution Manufacturing; Retailing
- Parent: Wesfarmers
- Subsidiaries: Soul Pattinson; Pharmacists Advice
- Website: www.api.net.au

Australian Pharmaceutical Industries (API) is a health and beauty company owned by Wesfarmers. It is involved in pharmaceutical distribution, retailing and manufacturing. API is Australia's largest wholesale distributor of pharmaceutical and allied products. The company is involved in retailing through company-owned stores and franchise operations. API operates in the retail health and beauty industry under the following brands: Soul Pattinson and Pharmacist Advice.

== History ==
Australian Pharmaceutical Industries was incorporated as Chemists' Co-operative of New South Wales Limited in 1910 and later became known as Wholesale Drug Co before adopting its current name, Australian Pharmaceutical Industries, in 1971.

API acquired Newmans & Western Pharmaceuticals in 1996, and in the following year Amed Supplies Australia was acquired to increase its coverage in medical and surgical products for the hospital market.

API was listed on the Australian Securities Exchange on 16 June 1997.

Chemworld Chemist, a new retail pharmacy banner group, was launched in 1998. API acquired the pharmaceutical wholesaling and manufacturing operations of Washington H Soul Pattinson in 2000.

On 29 October 2001, API purchased Hospital Supplies of Australia, the hospital and medical wholesale distribution business previously owned by the Victorian Healthcare Association. This enabled API to extend its distribution business to the public and private hospital market.

On 1 October 2002, API acquired the Interpacific and Interpharma businesses in New Zealand. These companies operated pharmacy wholesaling and retailing in New Zealand, the manufacture of over the counter pharmaceuticals, and wholesale distribution of dental products. This acquisition included Zuellig Pharma, PSM Healthcare and Halas Dental.

The retail brands of Priceline, Priceline Pharmacy, House and Price Attack were acquired on 6 October 2004 from the New Price Retail business. This propelled API to restructure its operations to focus primarily on growing its pharmaceutical distribution, retailing and manufacturing business. The retail led strategy was established by Jeff Sher, the architect of the Priceline Pharmacy model.

The next year, API continued to narrow its focus to the pharmacy channel and sold the Halas Dental business.

In 2005, API formed a joint venture with ABN AMRO Capital Advisory Australia. Later that year, the newly formed joint venture then acquired Clifford Hallam Pharmaceuticals.

API sold its New Zealand healthcare and logistics pharmacy business on 14 December 2005.

In 2007, API divested its House and Price Attack brands as part of its retail strategy to focus on Priceline.

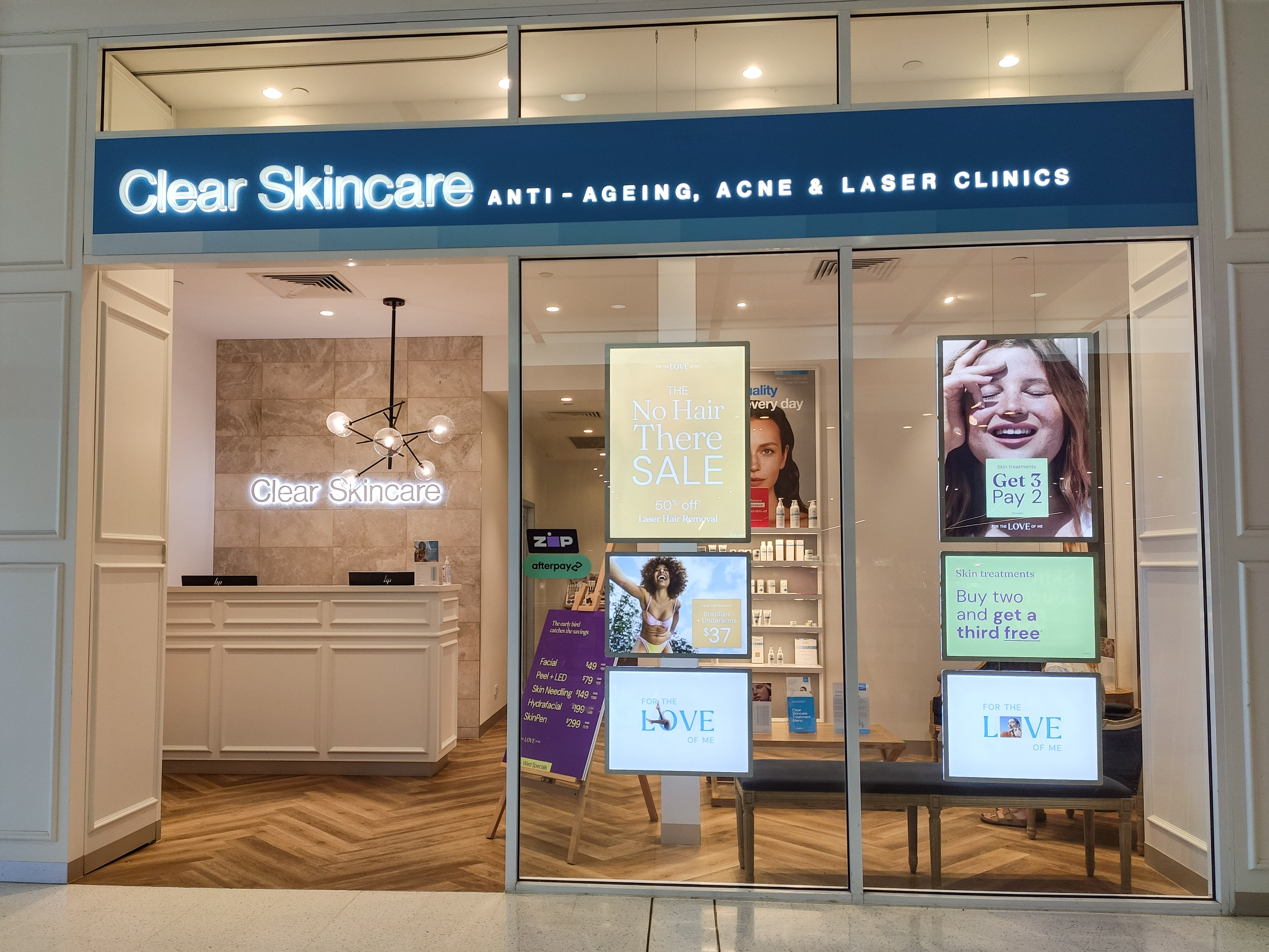
Clean Skincare is owned by API

In 2018, API made a deal to acquire Clearskincare Clinics for $127.4 million, initially taking a 50.1 per cent stake in the company and increasing to 100 per cent by the end of September 2021.

API was acquired by Wesfarmers for A$774 million in March 2022. API acquired the Silk Laser Clinics business in November 2023.

== Senior management ==
At the time of acquisition the directors of API were as follows:

Name	Role
Kenneth W Gunderson-Briggs	Chairman, Independent non-executive director
Emily Amos	Managing Director Wesfarmers Health
Lee Ausburn	Independent non-executive director
Jennifer Macdonald	Independent non-executive director
Janine Allis	Independent non-executive director
Clive Stiff	Independent non-executive director
George Tambassis	Independent non-executive director

== Controversies ==
=== Accounting discrepancies ===
In 2006 after the implementation of a new IT system, the company found $17.2 million of the company's declared profit had disappeared. Forensic Accountants called in could not find any trace of the money. API chose to write the full amount off their annual profit, causing a net loss of $17.2 million. The company's CEO Jeff Sher resigned after a strategic difference with the board in relation to the treatment of the accounting discrepancy which was proven to have historical significance predating the API acquisition of Priceline.

=== WorkChoices ===
The Priceline division shed 32 workers for "operational reasons" under the new WorkChoices Legislation. One of these workers, Andrew Cruickshank, a store layout planner, alleged Priceline fired him on his $101,000 a year contract, replacing him with someone on a $75 000 contract. Priceline claimed otherwise, "It was not the same role...the person wouldn't have been capable of doing the same things". The Australian Industrial Relations Commission ruled in favour of Priceline and found that Cruickshank's termination resulted from Priceline's financial difficulties and the subsequent decision to reorganise its structure.

=== Sigma takeover ===
Rival company Sigma Pharmaceuticals attempted to take over API in 2002, but was blocked by the Australian Competition & Consumer Commission. Sigma made another bid in 2006, and discussions continued until 11 December 2006, when Sigma withdrew its bid.

== See also ==
- Priceline (Australia)
