= First Choice Liquor Market =

Australian liquor store chain owned by Coles Group

- Old First Choice Liquor logo

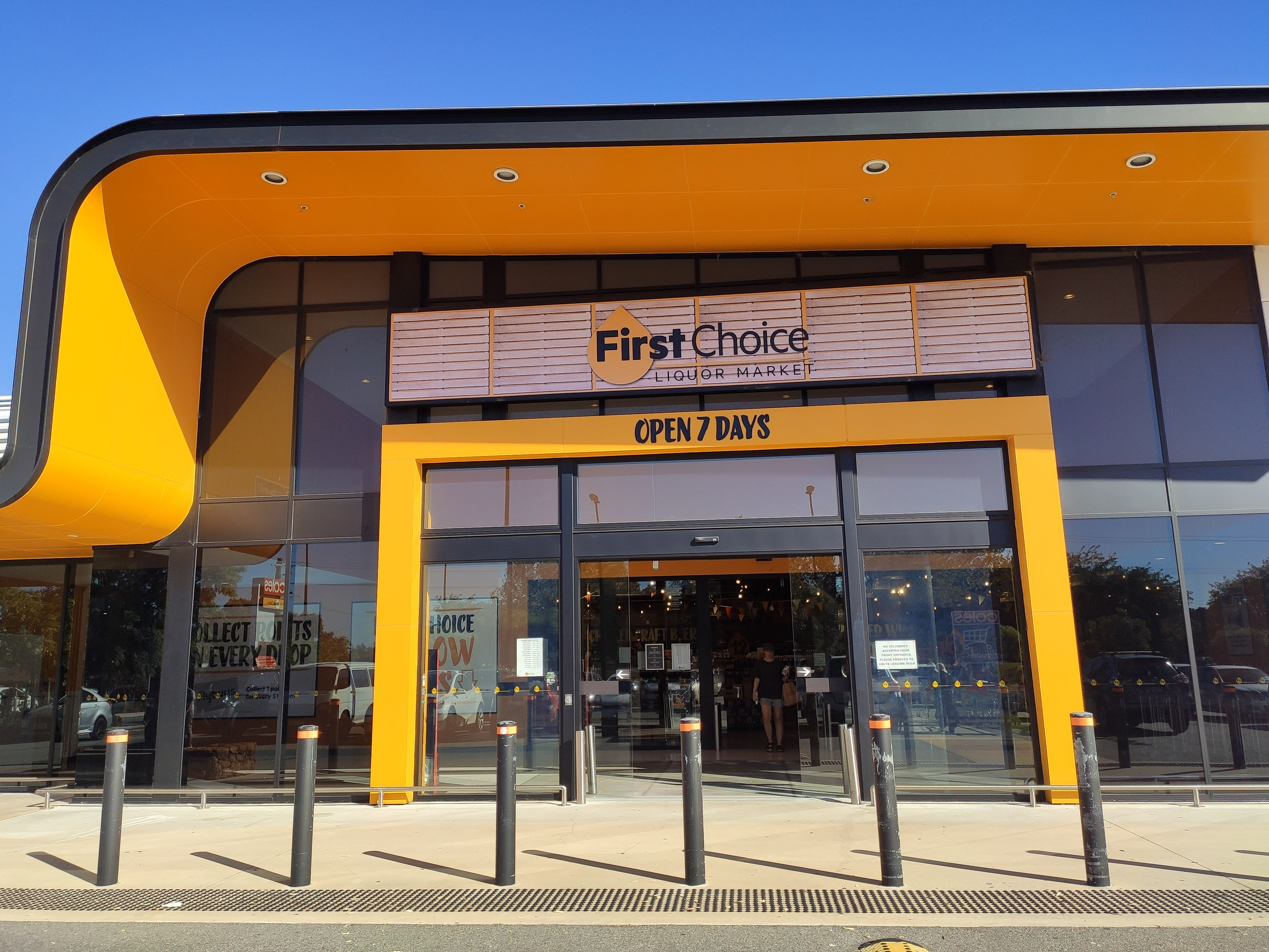
- First Choice Liquor Market store in Riverton
- Formerly: First Choice Liquor
- Type: Subsidiary
- Industry: Retail
- Founded: 2005; 21 years ago
- Defunct: 2025; 1 year ago
- Fate: Rebranded to Liquorland Warehouse
- Headquarters: Glen Iris, Victoria, Australia
- Number of locations: 98 stores (2018)
- Products: Liquor
- Parent: Coles
- Website: www.firstchoiceliquor.com.au

First Choice Liquor Market is a chain of liquor superstores in Australia owned by Coles Group. It sits alongside Liquorland and Vintage Cellars, Coles' other liquor brands. It competes principally with the Endeavour Group-owned Dan Murphy's chain as a big-box retailer in the takeaway liquor market. Stores are currently being gradually rebranded to Liquorland Warehouse.

== History ==
First Choice Liquor grew out of the former Quaffers brand. The first store was opened in May 2005 at Tooronga Village in Melbourne. Expansion of the chain was assisted with Coles Group purchasing the Queensland-based Hedley Hotel chain and Mr Corks Liquor Group in 2006.

An ultra-discount no-frills banner of Wesfarmers, called Liquor Market (with a 'yellow water/beer drop' logo) had experimented with about half a dozen stores in Melbourne from October 2016, then Sydney. However, the brand name failed to gain major traction, thus, they have been merged '1st Choice Liquor Market' since 2019 after Coles Group was spun out from Wesfarmers, with many 'First Choice' stores switching from their traditional blue theme and signage to the yellow colouring.

As at June 2018 there were 98 First Choice Liquor Market stores.

First Choice Liquor Market expanded into Tasmania in February 2024. In September 2024, Coles announced it would begin a pilot program to rebrand some First Choice Liquor Market stores as Liquorland Warehouse. Having been deemed a success, Coles announced in March 2025 that all stores would be rebranded by December 2025 with the First Choice Liquor Market brand retired.
