= Walter Harper (businessman) =

Australian agriculturalist

- Born: Charles Walter Harper; 27 January 1880; Guildford, Western Australia, Australia
- Died: 1 July 1956 (aged 76); Perth, Western Australia, Australia
- Occupation: Businessman
- Years active: 1921–1953
- Known for: Co–founder and chairman of Wesfarmers
- Spouse: Margaret Drummond (m. 1910)
- Children: 6

Charles Walter Harper (27 January 1880 – 1 July 1956) was an Australian agriculturalist who was prominent in the cooperative movement in Western Australia. He was one of the founders of Wesfarmers, serving as its chairman from 1921 to 1953, and also helped establish what is now CBH Group.

== Early life ==
Harper was born in Guildford, Western Australia, the son of Fanny (née de Burgh) and Charles Harper. His father was a landowner, newspaper proprietor, and member of parliament. Harper was the oldest of six sons and four daughters; two of his younger brothers would be killed in the Gallipoli Campaign. He attended Hale School and Guildford Grammar School, and then moved to the United States for a period to study fruit-growing industry in California. After finishing his education, Harper took over his father's estate at Woodbridge. He married Margaret Drummond in 1910; they had six children together.

== Career ==
=== Cricket ===
He played three first-class cricket matches for Western Australia in 1908/09. He made a high score of 11 not out and took two wickets.

=== Wesfarmers ===
Harper was active in the Farmers' and Settlers' Association, and at a 1913 meeting successfully proposed a motion for the creation of Westralian Farmers Co‐operative Limited (now known as Wesfarmers). He became a director of the new company – organised as a cooperative – and in 1921 replaced Matthew Padbury as chairman of the board. His tenure would last until 1953, when he finally retired at the age of 73. As chairman, Harper oversaw and encouraged the diversification that would eventually become Wesfarmers' hallmark. The company's 1927 foray into superphosphates (a joint venture now known as CSBP) was a pet project, as it was based on soil research that he himself had done years earlier in conjunction with William Grasby. A "frugal, abstemious, reserved man", Harper requested only £600 a year for most of his tenure, and his personal conservatism was often reflected in the way the company operated.

=== Other ===
In 1919, Harper became the inaugural chairman of the Cooperative Federation of Western Australia. He was also a trustee of the Cooperative Wheat Pool of Western Australia and an officeholder in the Fruit Growers' Association. Harper helped establish Cooperative Bulk Handling (CBH) in the early 1930s, which was initially aligned with Wesfarmers but later became independent. Within a few decades it had become "Australia's cheapest and most efficient grain-handling authority". Harper was not involved with party politics, but governments regularly employed him in an advisory capacity. In 1924, he chaired a state royal commission into the Group Settlement Scheme, writing the committee's report himself. He was also a member of the 1934 federal royal commission into the wheat, flour, and bread industries.
