= Priceline (Australia) =

Australian health and beauty retailer owned by Wesfarmers

- Priceline Pharmacy and Priceline logo

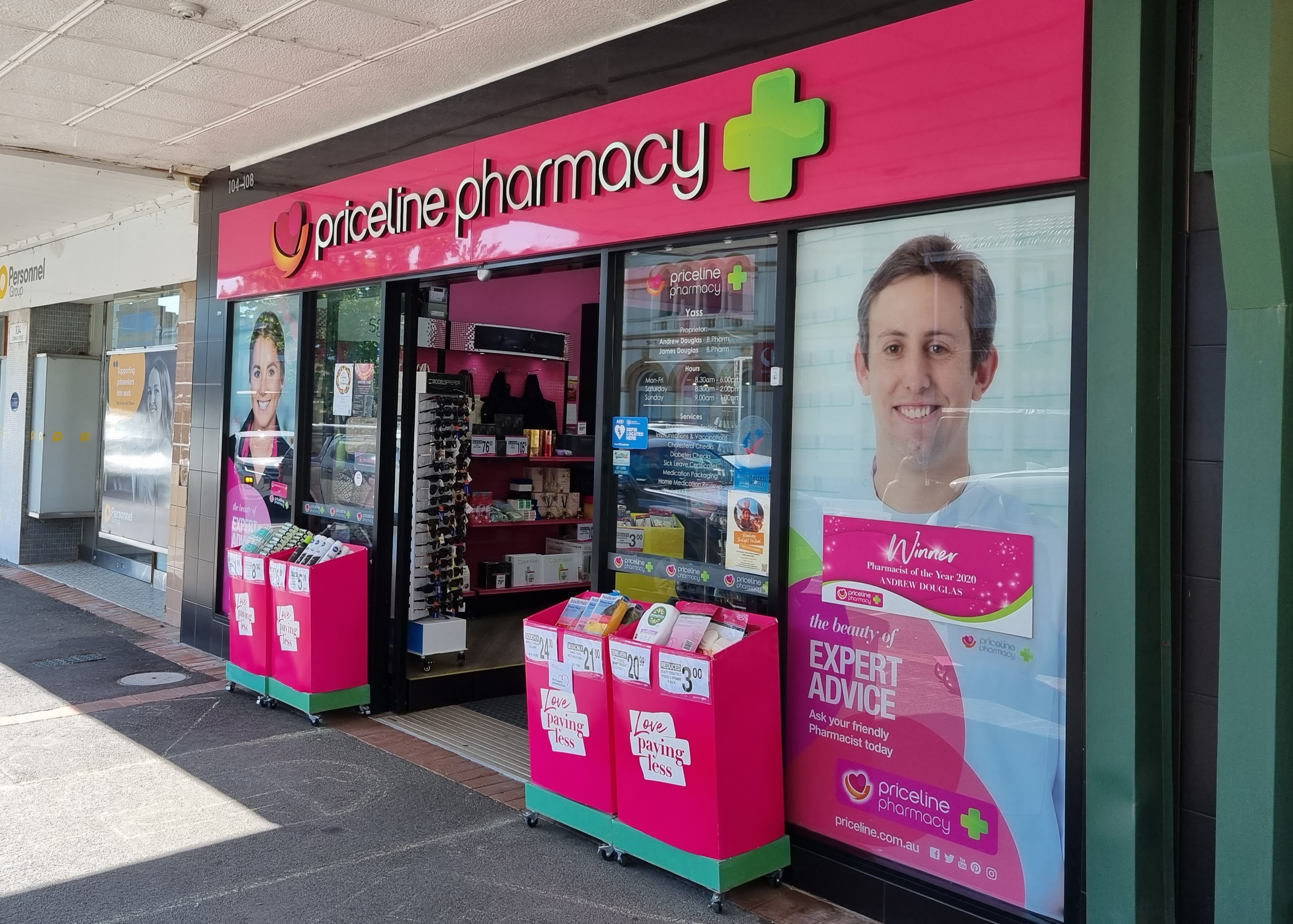
- Priceline Pharmacy in Yass, New South Wales
- Type: Subsidiary
- Industry: Pharmaceuticals; Healthcare; Beauty; Retail
- Founded: 1982; 44 years ago
- Headquarters: Victoria, Australia
- Number of locations: 480+ stores
- Area served: Australia
- Products: Health and beauty
- Number of employees: 7000+
- Parent: Wesfarmers Health
- Website: priceline.com.au

Priceline is an Australian health and beauty retailer. The Priceline brand has two store types; a traditional Priceline and Priceline Pharmacy. It is owned by Australian Pharmaceutical Industries, (API) which was acquired by Wesfarmers in 2022.

== History ==
Priceline was established in 1982; the first store opened at Highpoint Shopping Centre, and started as a beauty retailer.

In 2004 Australian Pharmaceutical Industries acquired the New Price Retail business which operated the retail brands of Priceline, Priceline Pharmacy, House, and Price Attack. API divested its House and Price Attack chains in 2007 to focus its retailing strategy on the Priceline brand.

In 2008 Priceline launched a brand re-positioning with a new visual identity, store format and merchandise. This is when the livery changed to the recognisable magenta pink shade synonymous with the Priceline brand.

In November 2021, Priceline was included in the sale of Australian Pharmaceutical Industries to Wesfarmers.

=== Atomica ===
Wesfarmers tested a new premium beauty store format, Atomica, to compete with rival upmarket chains and brands such as Mecca and give Priceline more appeal to the market. Some Priceline stores have been upgraded to Atomica, with fears all remaining non-Priceline Pharmacy stores will be changed to Atomica.

=== Infinity Pharmacy Group ===
In December 2025, KPMG was appointed receivers by API to 54 franchises after talks for a bailout of their operator Infinity Pharmacy Group collapsed. Teneo was appointed as administrator. Infinity owed $400 million, including $255 million to Wesfarmers, Commonwealth Bank, National Australia Bank and Westpac. API blames the inability and unwillingness of the operator to pay suppliers and creditors as well as the operator's leveraged aggressive expansion for the move, and says the administration was "unavoidable". The franchises will operate as per normal while KPMG assesses the business. Priceline Pharmacy on the whole is unaffected and will trade as per normal.

== Operations ==
Priceline is a health and beauty retailer of cosmetics, skin care, hair care and health care products. Priceline is involved in pharmaceutical retailing through the Priceline Pharmacy brand. There are over 480 Priceline stores throughout Australia. As of March 2025, 68 stores are owned by Wesfarmers and 413 are run by franchisees and have a pharmacy attached.

Australian business publication BRW ranked Priceline as Australia's 16th fastest growing franchise by revenue in 2010. Total network sales for the financial year 2019 were up 2.4 per cent to $2.2 billion.

== Loyalty program ==
Priceline's loyalty program, Sister Club, has over 8.4 million members, making it one of the largest retail loyalty programs in Australia. Members earn points when making purchases and are rewarded with discount vouchers and prizes. Sister Club members accounted for more than 40% of Priceline's retail sales in 2009, with the average Club member sale more than 30% higher than for a non-Club customer.

== Industrial relations case ==
In 2007, Andrew Cruickshank, a store layout planner, was dismissed from his job from Priceline for 'operational reasons' under the WorkChoices Legislation. He alleged Priceline fired him on his $101,000 a year contract, replacing him with someone on a $75,000 contract. Priceline claimed otherwise, saying "It was not the same role...the person wouldn't have been capable of doing the same things". The Australian Industrial Relations Commission ruled in favour of Priceline and found that Cruickshank's termination resulted from Priceline's financial difficulties and the subsequent decision to reorganise its structure.

== Class action lawsuit ==
A potential class action lawsuit in 2021 was being planned by law firm Levitt Robinson on behalf of Priceline franchisees. The class action, centred around control of the pharmacies, faced trouble initially when the litigation funder withdrew. The lawsuit was discontinued in 2022 after too few franchisees joined the class action.
