= Kleenheat Gas =

Australian gas producer, retailer and distributor

Kleenheat
- Company type: Division
- Industry: Energy
- Founded: 1956; 70 years ago
- Headquarters: Murdoch, Western Australia, Australia
- Parent: Wesfarmers
- Website: kleenheat.com.au

Kleenheat is an Australian gas producer, retailer and distributor based in Perth, Western Australia.

Kleenheat produces around 150,000 tonnes of liquefied petroleum gas (LPG) per year to service more than 240,000 customers nationally. The company also supplies liquefied natural gas (LNG) to the heavy-vehicle, power generation and industrial markets nationally through EVOL LNG.

== History ==
Kleenheat Gas was established by Wesfarmers in 1956 under the leadership of then General Manager John Thomson, who raised the prospect of selling bottled gas with BP during a visit to London. He returned with an exclusive franchise agreement to supply LPG from BP's then-new Kwinana Oil Refinery.

In September 1956, Kleenheat Gas became the first company to distribute bottled LPG and gas appliances to regional Western Australia. Demand for the convenience of gas was so great that 1500 appliances were sold before the first gas bottles were available.

In 2013, Kleenheat Gas launched a natural gas retailing business, introducing retail competition in Western Australia for residential and small business customers from Geraldton to Busselton for the first time. Previously, the market had operated under a monopoly by American-owned Alinta Energy.

In April 2014, Kleenheat Gas reviewed its LPG operations and agreed to sell its LPG distribution business in Victoria, South Australia, Queensland, New South Wales, the Australian Capital Territory and Tasmania to Elgas Limited. The sale was completed in December 2014.

In May 2024, Kleenheat announced its intention to sell their LPG operations to Supagas, and their LNG operations (Evol) to Cefa. The sale was completed on 2 December 2024. The sale did not include the Natural Gas business, nor the Kwinana Production Facility.

== Products ==
- Natural gas – Kleenheat supplies natural gas to around 150,000 customers in households and small businesses from Busselton to Geraldton.
