= Vintage Cellars =

Australian liquor store chain owned by Coles Group

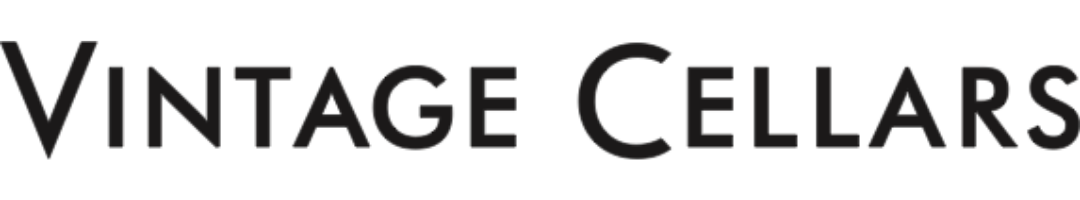

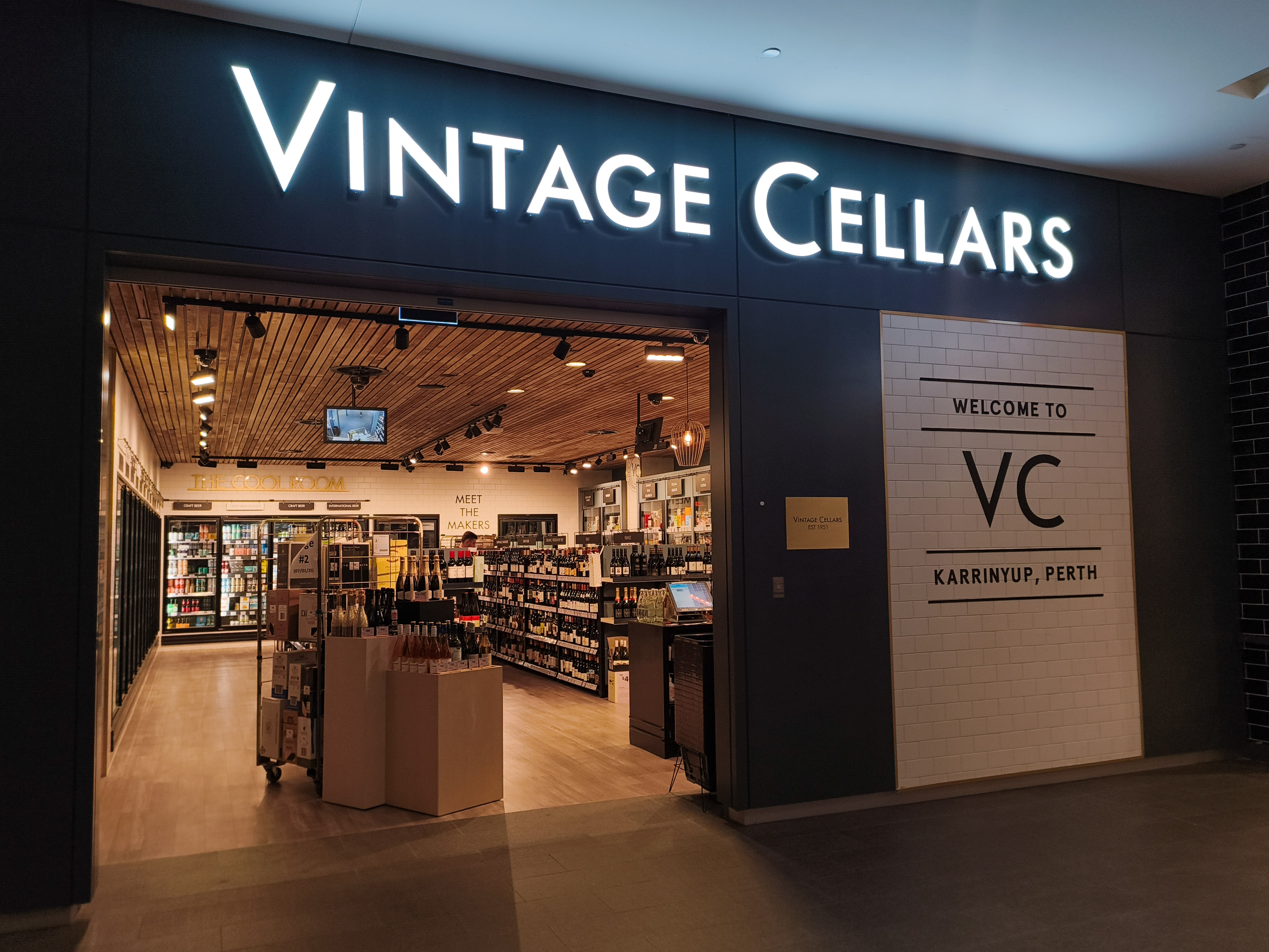
- Vintage Cellars store in Karrinyup Shopping Centre
- Company type: Subsidiary
- Industry: Retail
- Founded: 1951; 75 years ago
- Founder: Jack Edwards; Edward Hayward
- Defunct: 2025
- Fate: Rebranded to Liquorland
- Headquarters: Glen Iris, Victoria, Australia
- Number of locations: 90+ stores (2025)
- Products: Liquor
- Parent: Coles Group

Vintage Cellars was an Australian liquor chain owned by Coles Group and was positioned at the higher end of the market compared to Liquorland and First Choice Liquor Market, the Coles Group's other liquor brands. The chain was folded into the Liquorland brand in 2025.

== History ==
Vintage Cellars was established in 1951 by Jack Edwards and Edward Hayward with the first store opening on Gawler Place, Adelaide. In 1990, the New Zealand liquor group Magnum Corporation purchased 50 percent of Vintage Cellars which, at the time, had 27 stores in South Australia. In 1992, Coles Myer acquired Vintage Cellars from Magnum. As of March 2025, there were more than 90 Vintage Cellars stores around Australia.

In September 2024, Coles announced it would begin a pilot program to rebrand some Vintage Cellars stores as Liquorland Cellars. Having been deemed a success, Coles announced in March 2025 that all stores would be converted to either Liquorland Cellars or Liquorland stores by December 2025 with the Vintage Cellars brand retired.

== Loyalty program ==
The Vintage Cellars Wine Club loyalty program was launched in 1994, allowing customers to earn points on wine purchases which could later be redeemed for store discounts. The program was renamed VC Club in 2022.

== Gallery ==
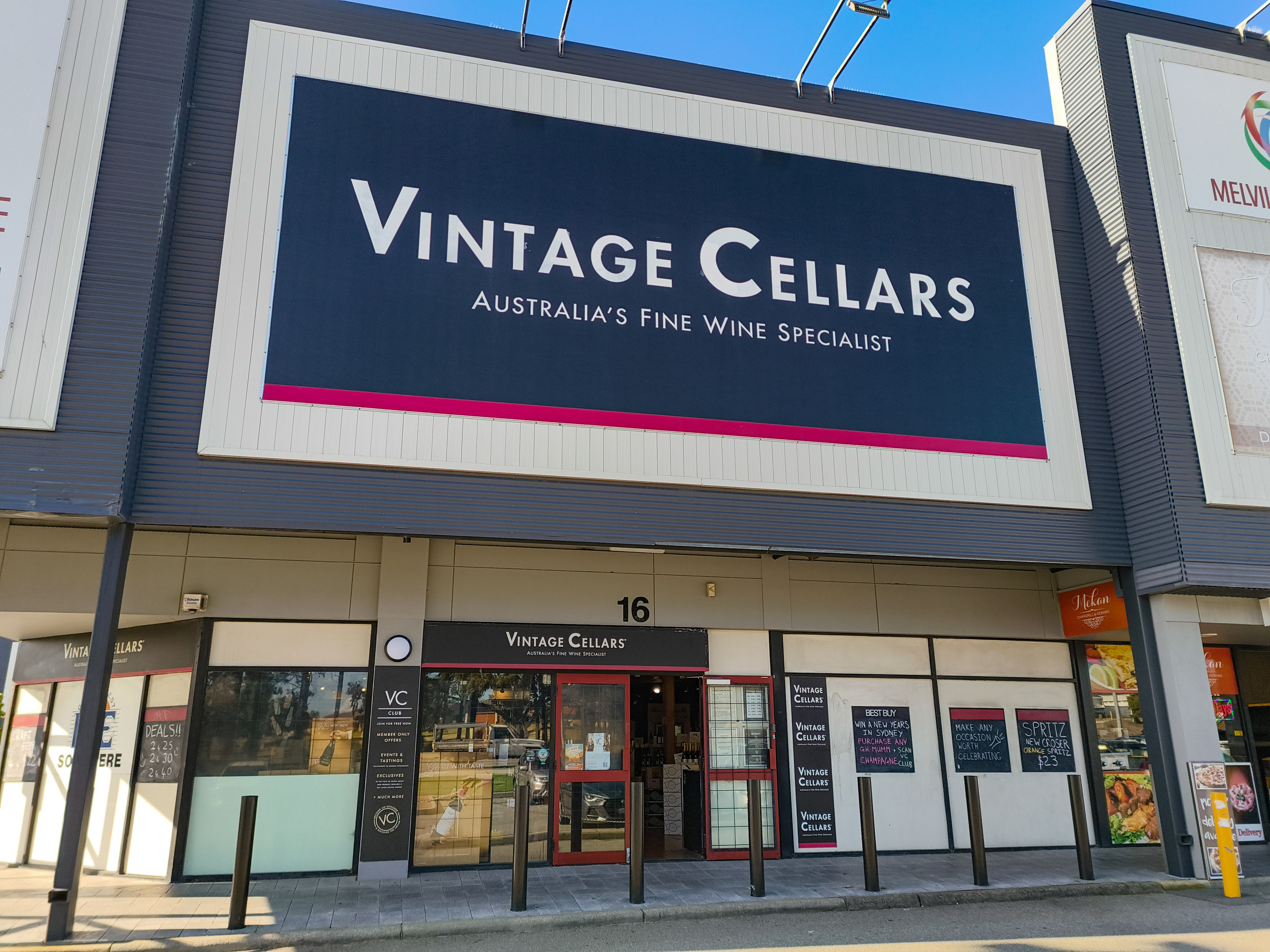
Store in Myaree, Western Australia

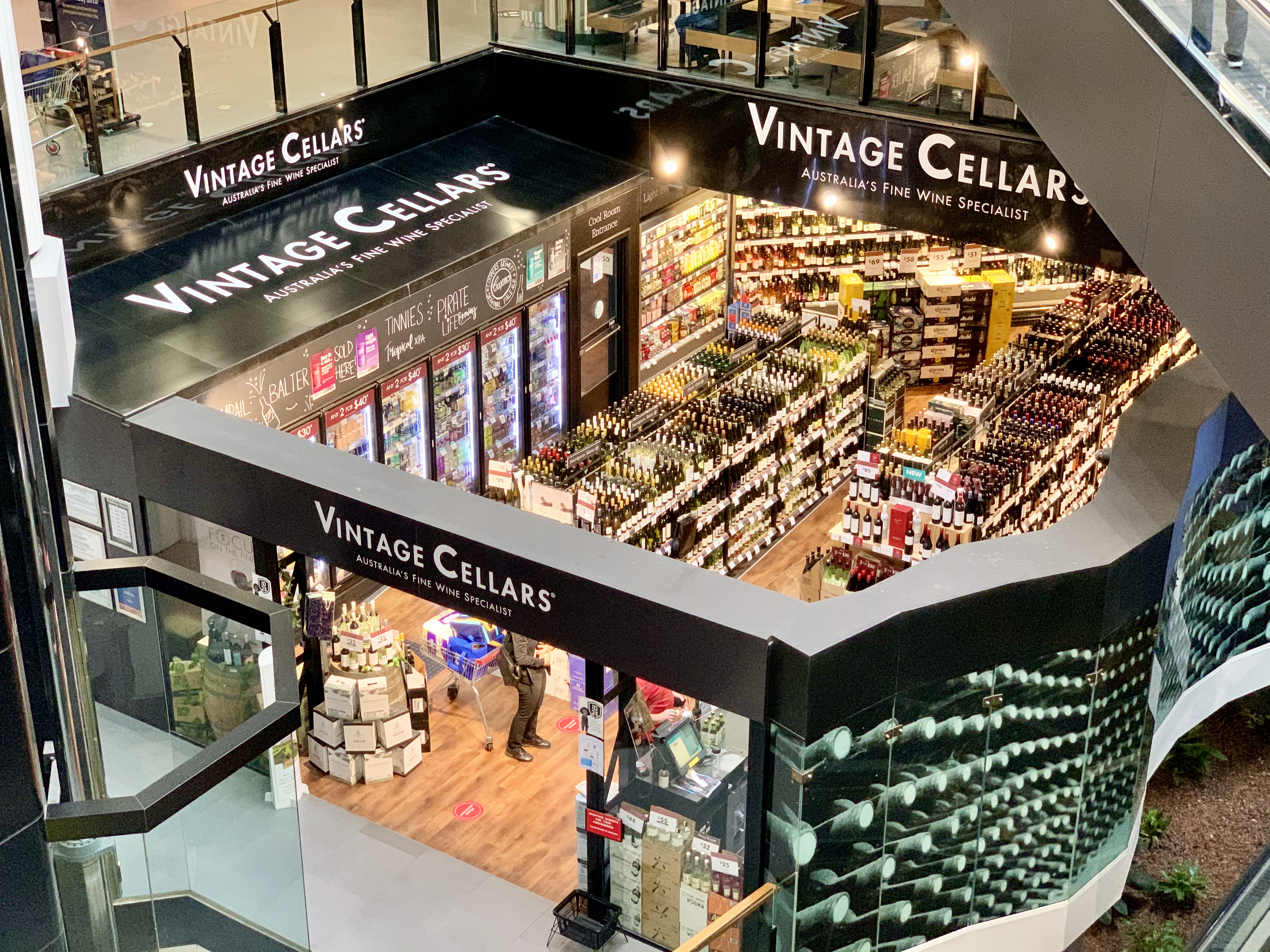
Store at Toowong Village, Brisbane

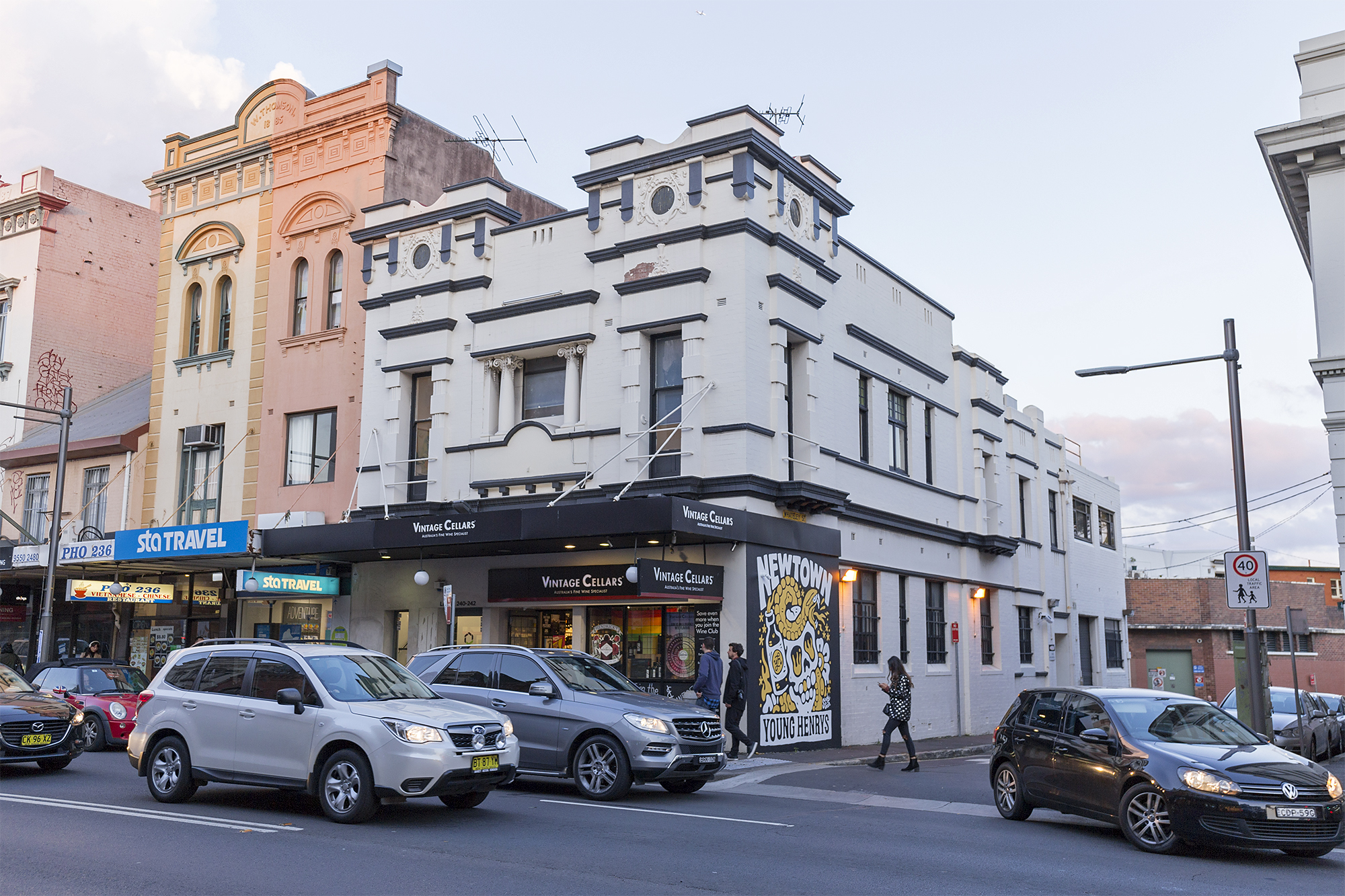
Store in Newtown, New South Wales

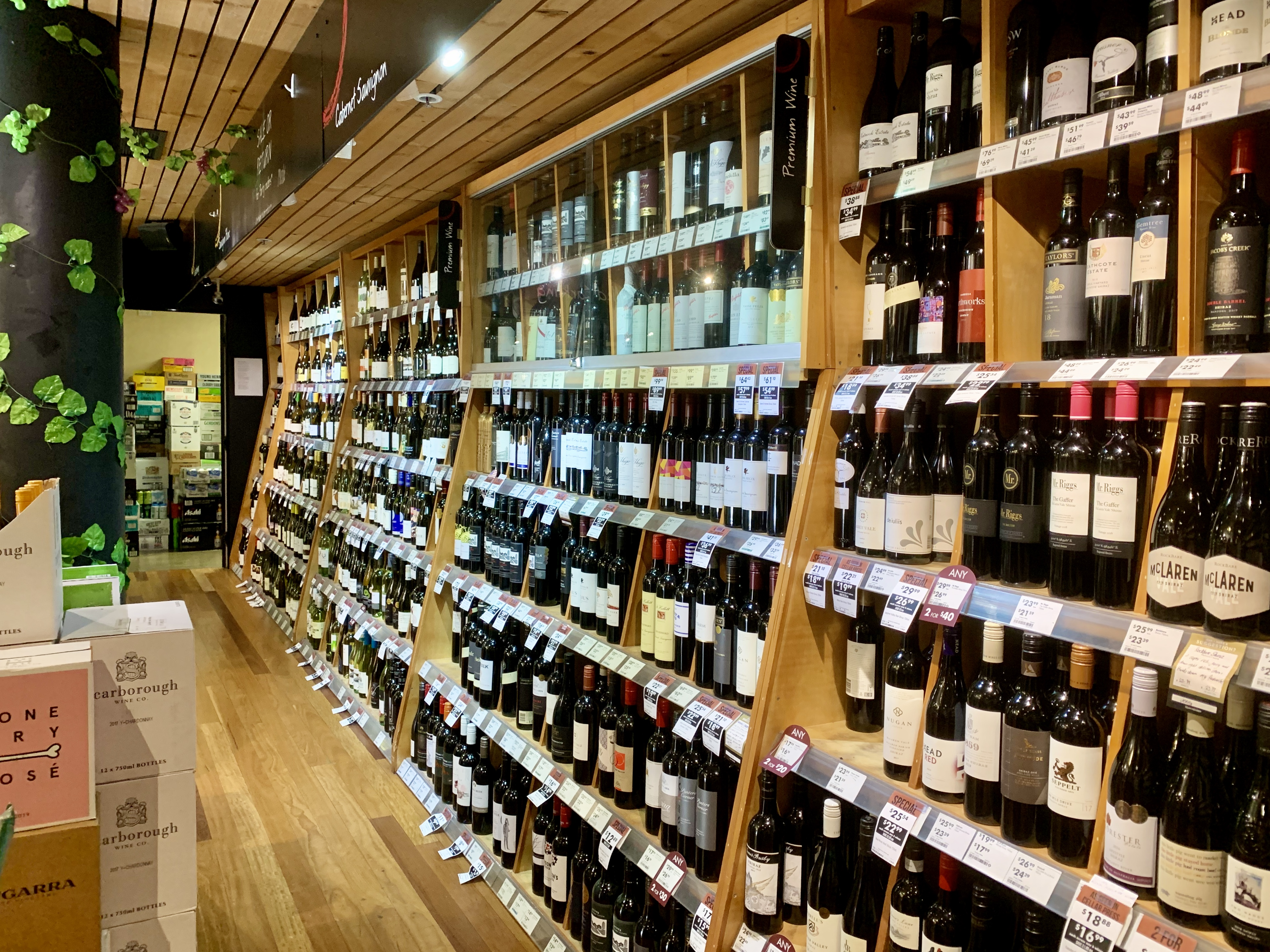
Interior of Vintage Cellars in Spring Hill
