= Liquorland =

Australian liquor store chain owned by Coles Group

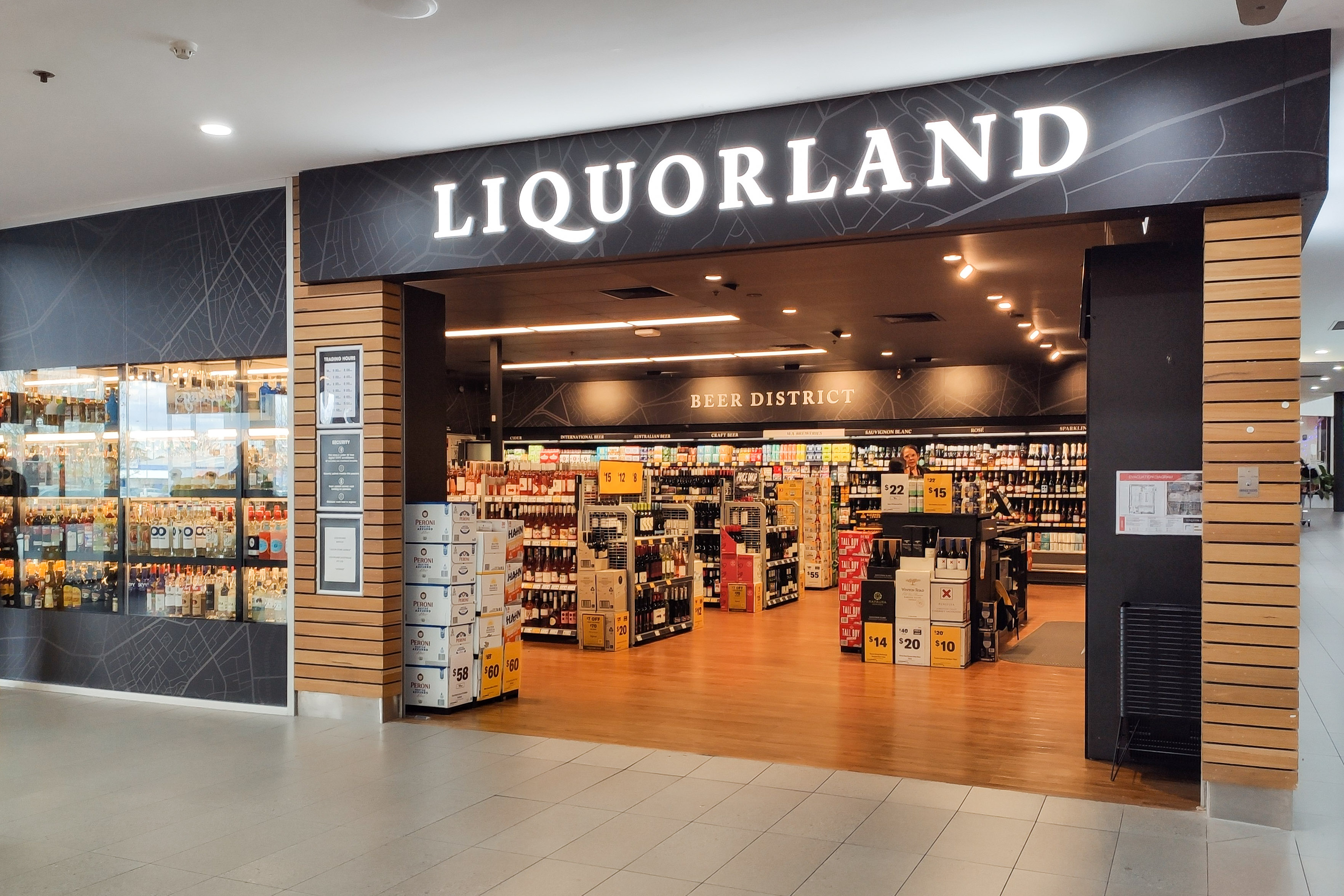
- Liquorland store in Bentley, Western Australia
- Type: Subsidiary
- Industry: Retail
- Headquarters: Hawthorn East, Victoria, Australia
- Number of locations: 1,000 stores (2023)
- Key people: Michael Courtney (chief executive)
- Products: Liquor
- Parent: Coles Liquor
- Website: liquorland.com.au

Liquorland is an Australian liquor store chain. It is one of two liquor brands within the Coles Group, along with the larger discount format First Choice Liquor Market (which has been rebranded as Liquorland Warehouse Store) and formerly the more upmarket oriented Vintage Cellars though this brand has since been merged under the Liquorland banner. The Liquorland chain comprised 743 stores as of March 2023.

== History ==
Old Liquorland logo

Coles Supermarkets established interests with its expansion into liquor in 1981, with the acquisition of Liquorland and Vintage Cellars. In November 2007 Wesfarmers acquired the Coles Group and as a result the separate Coles division was formed, but was again demerged on 21 November 2018.

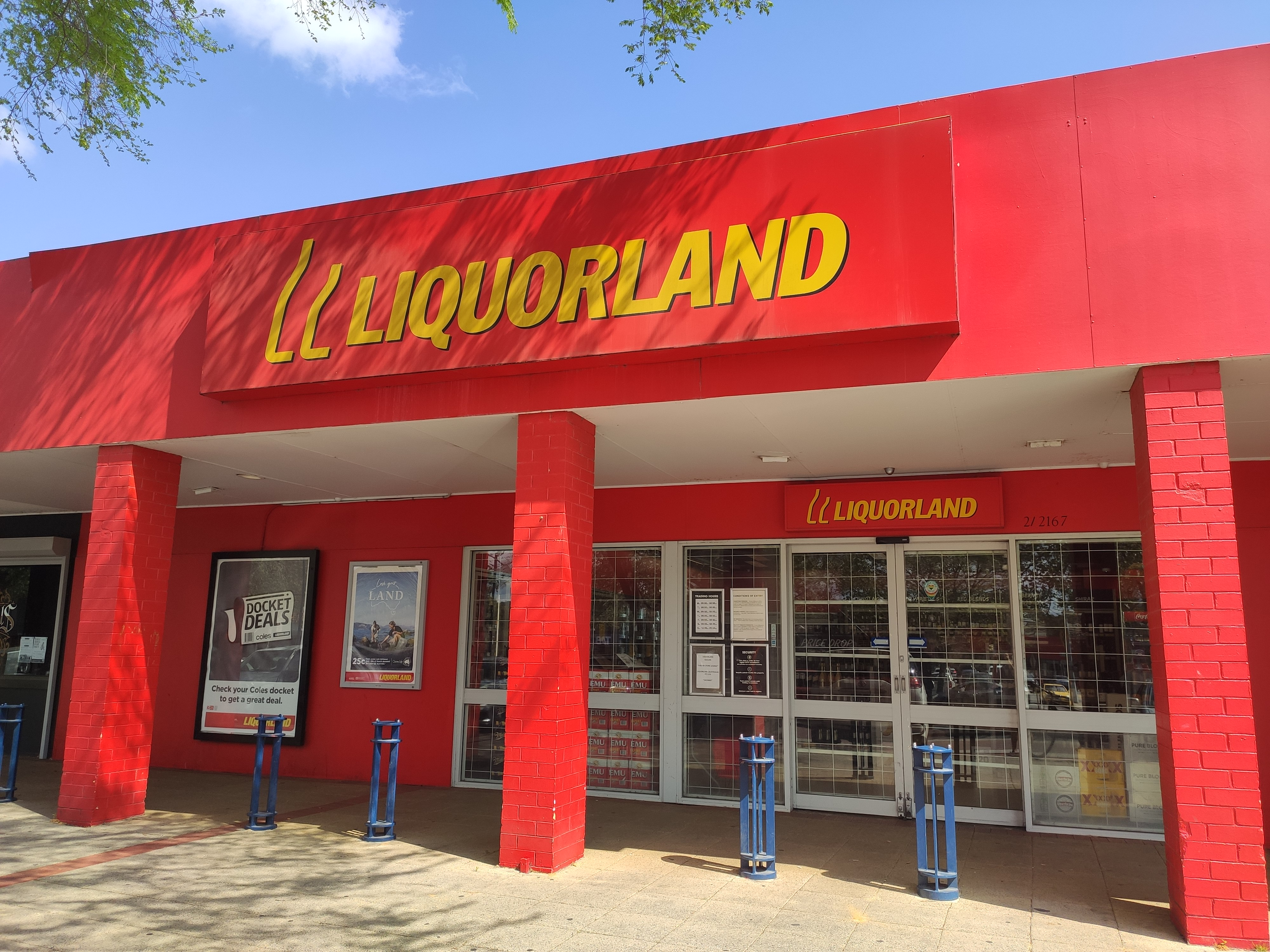
Liquorland store in Gosnells, Western Australia with older branding

Most Liquorland outlets are adjacent to or within Coles Supermarkets, except in Queensland, where legislation forbids this practice. In order to maintain a presence, Liquorland operated the Spirit Hotel chain, which comprised 87 hotels as of March 2019 (76 in Queensland, seven in South Australia and four in Western Australia).

Wesfarmers had long expressed discomfort about the poker machines in Spirit Hotel's pubs and had been trying to sell its hotel portfolio while retaining its lucrative liquor store business. In March 2019, Coles established a joint venture with Australian Venue Co. (AVC) where AVC would take over operations of the hotels and receive its profits while Coles would run the liquor stores and receive its profits. If AVC purchased further hotels in Queensland, Coles would also have the right to operate existing liquor stores attached to the hotels or open new stores using the hotels' liquor licenses. Coles received $200 million from AVC as part of the deal.

Beginning in 2020, Liquorland began transitioning stores to a new, more upmarket visual identity. In August 2022, the first Liquorland store was opened in Tasmania. In February 2024, Coles Liquor reached an agreement to acquire all 20 of Federal Group's 9/11 liquor stores in Tasmania. The stores were subsequently rebranded as Liquorland.

== Store formats ==
=== Liquorland ===
Standard format

=== Liquorland Cellars ===
In September 2024, Coles announced it would begin a pilot program to rebrand some Vintage Cellars stores to Liquorland. Having been deemed a success, Coles announced in March 2025 that all Vintage Cellars stores would be converted to either Liquorland Cellars or Liquorland stores by December 2025.

=== Liquorland Warehouse ===
In September 2024, Coles announced it would begin a pilot program to rebrand some First Choice Liquor Market stores to Liquorland Warehouse. Having been deemed a success, Coles announced in March 2025 that all First Choice Liquor Market stores would be converted to either Liquorland Warehouse or Liquorland stores by December 2025.

== Private label brands ==
In January 2013 Coles released a range of beers under the brand Steamrail Brewing Company. The beers, 'Ghost of Eyre' Pale ale, 'Gold Digger' Golden Ale and 'Lucky Amber' Amber Ale, were stocked in First Choice Liquor and Liquorland outlets. The Steamrail Brewing Company range is brewed at the Asahi Breweries plant in Laverton, Victoria.

Liquorland exclusive beer brands also include Hammer 'N' Tongs, 3 Pub Circus and Lorry Boys.
