= Mayne Group =

Former Australian healthcare and logistics company

- Formerly: Mayne Nickless
- Traded as: ASX: MYX
- Industry: Healthcare; Logistics
- Founded: 1886
- Founder: John Mayne; Enoch Nickless
- Defunct: 2005
- Headquarters: St Kilda Road, Melbourne, Australia
- Subsidiaries: Armaguard; Corporate Wellness Solutions; Health Care of Australia; Interlink Express; Ipec; Loomis; Security Express Guards
- Website: www.maynegroup.com

Mayne Group was an Australian healthcare and logistics company.

== History ==
Mayne Nickless was founded in Melbourne in 1886 by John Mayne and Enoch Nickless as a parcel delivery service. Within three months it was operating 10 horse-drawn vans, by the end of the year it had 52.

Listed on the Australian Securities Exchange in 1926, it expanded to provide freight services to all Australian capital cities and ports. It also branched into armoured car cash deliveries and international logistics.

In 1975, it entered a joint venture with Trans Australia Airlines to form AAT Coachlines, which was sold in 1983. In 1979 it purchased cash handling company Loomis. In July 1982, Mayne Nickless took a 50% shareholding in Total West in partnership with Westrail. In 1985, Mayne Nickless sold its stake in Total West to Gascoyne Trading Company. In 1983, Mayne acquired a 50% shareholding in Ipec. It acquired the other 50% in 1988.

In 1992 Mayne Nickless took a 25% shareholding in telecommunications company Optus, this was sold in 2001.

After being found to have been part of a price fixing cartel along with Ansett and TNT in the early 1990s, it disposed of its remaining transport and security interests with Interlink and Ipec being sold to the Toll Group, Interlink Express to La Poste and Armaguard to Linfox.

In the 1990s, it diversified into healthcare, purchasing hospitals and later pathology and diagnostic businesses. In 2001 pharmaceutical company Faulding Pharmaceuticals was purchased. In 2002, Mayne Nickless changed its name to Mayne Group.

In November 2000, Mayne's freight operations in the United Kingdom were sold to Geopost and its container parks and warehousing facilities in Sydney, Melbourne and Brisbane were sold to Lang Corporation. In January 2002, Mayne Nickless was rebranded as the Mayne Group.

In 2003, Mayne's 53 hospitals were sold to Affinity Health, a consortium of Citigroup, CVC Capital Partners and GIC Private Limited. In November 2005, the company was split into Mayne Pharma and Symbion Health. Mayne Pharma was taken over by Hospira in 2007. Symbion Health was acquired by Primary Health Care in 2008. The same year, Primary sold off Symbion's consumer business to Sanofi and its pharmacy business to Zuellig Group. In 2013, EBOS Group purchased Symbion from Zuellig.
