= John Thomson (Australian businessman) =

Western Australian businessman

John Thomson (1887–1960) was a Western Australian businessman who was general manager of Wesfarmers for 32 years, from 1925 to his retirement in 1957. Thomson developed the concept of bulk wheat handling, established the radio station 6WF, and founded the first milk pasteurisation plant in Western Australia.

The John Thomson Agricultural Economics Centre at the University of Western Australia's Institute of Agriculture was named after him. It was established in 1962 to research the economic perspective of the state's agricultural problems.
