= Trevor Eastwood =

Australian business executive

Trevor Eastwood AM was the CEO of the large Australian corporation Wesfarmers Ltd from 1984 to 1992 and its chairman from 2002 to 2008. After graduating BEng at the University of Western Australia, he joined Wesfarmers in 1963 as a cadet engineer and was associated with the company for over 45 years. In July 2008, he announced his impending retirement, which took place on 13 November 2008, when he was replaced by Bob Every.

He was also a director of Qantas and West Australian Newspapers.

In July 2007, Eastwood authorised the biggest takeover in Australian financial history—Wesfarmers' acquisition of Coles Myer Limited. In February 2008, he entered a public controversy over alleged excessive remuneration of corporate executives, declaring Wesfarmers chief executive Michael Chaney's $7.9 million pay cheque as "outrageous", and reducing it. He later reminded shareholders that they could vote to remove directors who endorsed executive greed and, in May 2009, told a company directors’ forum that incentives should be abolished altogether.
