= Petroleum in Australia =

Australia is a minor petroleum producer and importer, with a number of petroleum companies involved in upstream and downstream operations. Western Australia is the largest contributor to Australia's production of most petroleum products.

== Historical context ==
Kerosene was used extensively in the mid-nineteenth century and early twentieth century as a fuel for lighting homes and streets. With the advent of the motor car, crude oil came into demand as a fuel. By 1911 petrol surpassed kerosene in sales as the fuel for most vehicles.

Most petroleum consumed in Australia was imported but, between 1865 and 1952, various companies made a small proportion locally, from oil shale.

Deposits of coorangite, a resilient rubber-like organic-rich sediment derived from lacustrine algae, found in the Coorong, were mistaken for oil seepages, and led to abortive attempts to find oil in the area. Australia's first oil rig was erected there in 1866.

Between the 1920s and 1950s, Shell and the Vacuum Oil Company were selling petrol through single-brand service stations while Golden Fleece, Independent Oil Industry and Commonwealth Oil Refineries operated through multiple-brand stations. In 1936, William Walkley founded the Australian Motorists Petrol Company Limited (later Ampol) in response to Australians' concerns about perceived inequitable petrol pricing, and allegations of transfer pricing by foreign oil companies to limit their tax liabilities in Australia.

The first oil discovery in Australia was made near Lakes Entrance, Victoria in 1924. The West Australian Petroleum Pty Ltd (WAPET) joint venture discovered Australia's first flowing oil in November 1953, at Rough Range on the North West Cape. WAPET later discovered in 1964 the first commercial natural gas field in Western Australia, at Dongara in the Perth Basin.

In 1998, the Federal Government discontinued fuel price regulation. However, the Victorian and Western Australian state governments passed their own price control legislations in 2000.

== Upstream ==
Upstream activities typically include the exploration and appraisal, development and construction, and production of oil and gas. The sector in Australia is dominated by international companies including Apache, BHP, Chevron, ConocoPhillips, ExxonMobil, Santos, Shell and Woodside. Out of these, Apache, ConocoPhillips, Chevron and ExxonMobil have parent companies in the US, while BP and Shell have parent companies in Europe. Santos and Woodside are based in Australia and are listed on the Australian Securities Exchange (ASX).

Most onshore and offshore production licences are also issued to multiple parties such as joint ventures. For example, the North West Shelf Venture comprises BHP, BP, Chevron, Shell, Woodside and a 50:50 joint venture between Mitsubishi and Mitsui & Co, with each holding an equal one-sixth shareholding.

According to a 2009 report by the Productivity Commission, joint ventures are important in the petroleum industry, as they "facilitate risk sharing, and allow businesses to specialise and still accomplish the maximum development of a given field." Joint ventures also allow "smaller businesses to be involved in production without raising the large quantities of capital required to develop a field alone."

=== Reserves ===
Over 80 per cent of Australia’s gas reserves and over 95 per cent of oil reserves are offshore, with reserves concentrated in the Bonaparte, Browse, Carnarvon and Gippsland basins.

== Downstream ==
After upstream activities, petroleum products are sold to downstream customers, such as oil refineries, gas retailers, and overseas markets.

=== Refineries ===
Treated crude oil cannot be used as fuel but must be refined.

Until the 2000s, there were seven oil refineries:

Refinery	Location	Owner	Capacity (ML pa) (as of 2007)	Decommissioned
Kwinana Oil Refinery	Perth, WA	BP	7960	2021
Kurnell Refinery	Sydney, NSW	Caltex Australia	7540	2014
Geelong Oil Refinery	Geelong, Vic	Shell Australia (later sold to Viva Energy)	6380	Active
Lytton Oil Refinery	Brisbane, Qld	Caltex Australia	6270	Active
Bulwer Island Refinery	Brisbane, Qld	BP	5110	2015
Clyde Refinery	Sydney, NSW	Shell Australia	4930	2013
Altona Refinery	Melbourne, Vic	ExxonMobil Australia	4530	2021

There was also an eighth refinery, the Port Stanvac Refinery near Adelaide SA, which was mothballed by ExxonMobil Australia in 2003 and permanently closed in 2009. The main reason for the closure was that it was "one of the smallest refineries in the Asia–Pacific region", and "could not compete against larger regional refineries".

By December 2020, three of the above seven refineries had already closed, with the Altona (ExxonMobil), Geelong (Viva), Kwinana (BP) and Lytton (Ampol) refineries remaining operational. The Kurnell Refinery was closed in 2014 and was converted into a fuel import terminal.

The Kwinana refinery closed in 2021, while the Altona refinery is in the final stages of closing down as of October 2022, with both refineries also being converted to fuel import terminals. This meant that from 2023, only the Geelong and Lytton refineries remain.

=== Marketing and distribution ===
The retail downstream business is dominated by Ampol, which has 1,900 stores across the country as of October 2022. This also includes 540 stations which are co-branded and operated by EG Australia.

Downstream petroleum retail companies
Company	Locations	Number of locations (as of October 2022)	Brands
Ampol	Nationwide	1,900 (Note: Including 540 EG Ampol co-branded stations.)	Ampol; EG Ampol
BP	Nationwide	1,400	BP
Viva Energy	Nationwide	1,334 (Note: Including 710 Coles Express co-branded stations, 284 Liberty Oil stations and about 50 Westside stations.)	Shell (Note: Under a trademark license agreement.); Liberty Oil; Westside
7-Eleven (Note: Sells Mobil fuel)		561 (as of 2020)	7-Eleven
United Petroleum	Nationwide	470 (as of 2026)	United; Astron
Chevron		340 (Note: Including 320 Puma and 20 Caltex stations.)	Caltex; Puma (phasing out); Gull Petroleum
ExxonMobil	All states and territories except Tasmania and Northern Territory	229	Mobil
Metro Petroleum	New South Wales, Victoria, Queensland and Western Australia	232 (as of 2020)	Metro Petroleum
Peregrine	South Australia and Victoria	160	OTR
