= Solo Oil =

Australian petroleum distributor

SOLO Australia
- Industry: Petroleum
- Founded: 1974, returned 2025
- Founder: David Golberger; David Wieland
- Defunct: 1989
- Headquarters: Melbourne, Australia
- Number of locations: 20 (2026)

SOLO Oil is an Australian Petrol Station company that operated from 1974 until 1989 when taken over by Ampol and revived in 2025 when it rebranded several Liberty sites in South Australia, Queensland and Victoria.

== History ==
Solo Oil was founded in 1974 by David Goldberger and David Wieland. Goldberger negotiated an agreement with Mobil Australia, for the supply of petroleum at a fixed rate, following the increase in world fuel prices, this discount increased from six cents to 12.5 cents per gallon. In July 1975, it joined forces with the Australian Council of Trade Unions (ACTU) to sell discounted fuel to independent operators in Melbourne. In April 1977 it commenced operations in Sydney.

In 1989 the business was sold to Ampol by which time it was the largest independent fuel retailer and distributor with over 200 service stations. Goldberger and Wieland were subject to a ten year non-compete clause however this was ruled void by the Trade Practices Commission after Ampol merged with Caltex, allowing them to establish Liberty Oil in 1995.

== Return and rebranding ==
In 2025, SOLO returned to Australia after Viva Energy acquired the remaining 50% of LOC Global; which resulted in several sites divesting and rebranding to SOLO as a wholly owned subsidiary of New World Corporation (NWC). Followed by purchasing other fuel station sites in Victoria, Queensland, South Australia, Northern Territory and Western Australia. Following this, the Reddy Express sites in Bundaberg and Mildura rebranded to SOLO.
