= Liberty Oil =

Australian convenience store and fuel station chain owned by Viva Energy

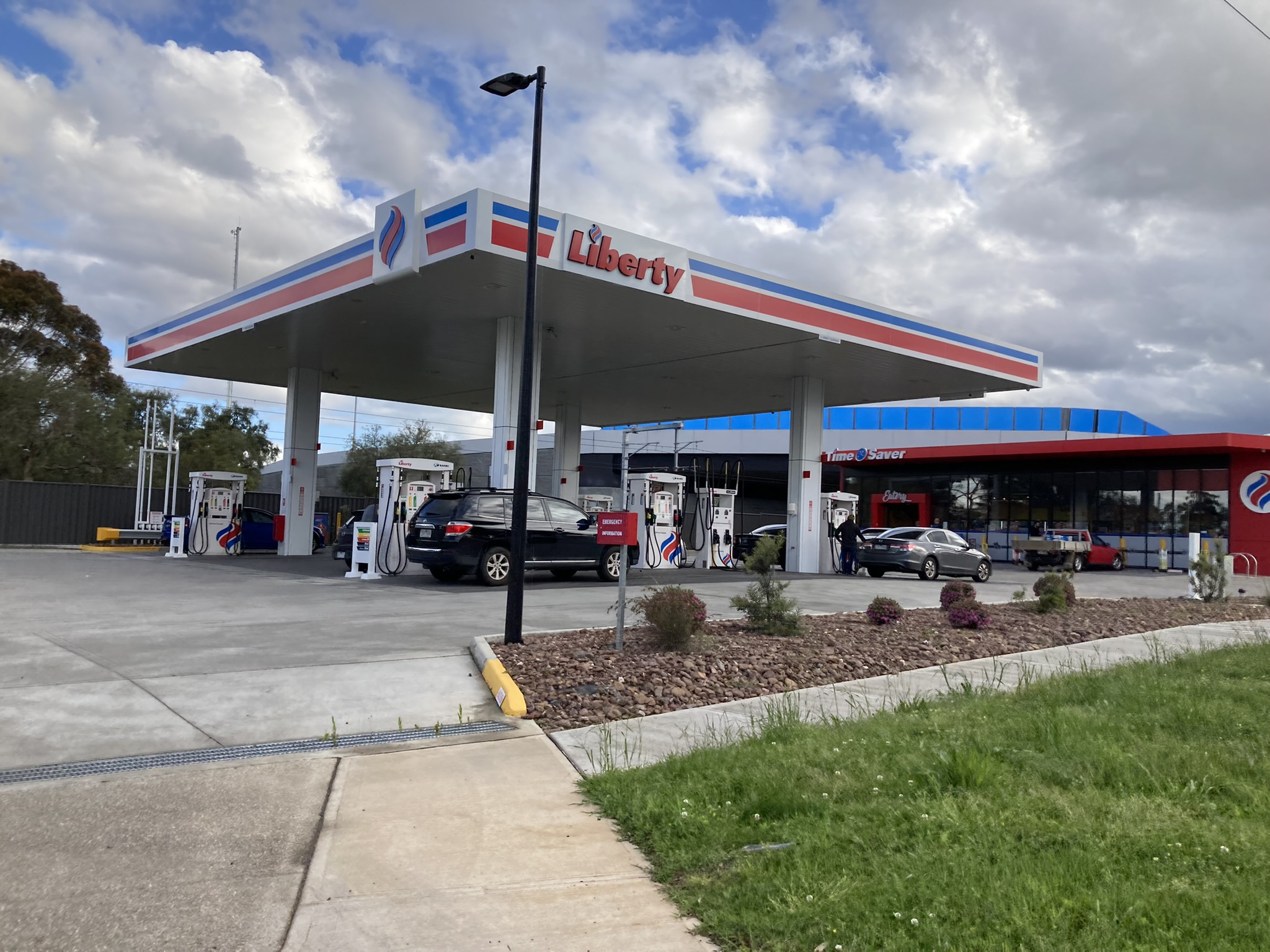
- Liberty Oil at Werribee, Melbourne
- Industry: Petroleum
- Founded: 1995
- Founder: David Golberger; David Wieland
- Headquarters: Melbourne, Australia
- Number of locations: 284 (2022)
- Parent: Viva Energy
- Website: www.libertyoil.com.au

Liberty Oil is an Australian petroleum distributor and retailer. It is owned and operated by Viva Energy, who also own Reddy Express and OTR. The company is not to be confused with Liberty Energy.

== History ==
Liberty Oil was founded in 1995 by David Goldberger and David Wieland, who had previously founded Solo in 1974, before selling it to Ampol in 1989. Goldberger and Wieland had been subject to a ten-year non-compete clause. However, this was ruled void by the Trade Practices Commission when Ampol merged with Caltex.

In July 2001, Liberty leased 69 of its sites to Woolworths which were rebranded as Woolworths Plus Petrol. At this stage it had an 8% market share of the Australian petrol market.

In August 2014, Viva Energy purchased a 50% shareholding, taking full ownership in February 2019. As part of Viva Energy taking full ownership, Liberty Oil Convenience was established as a new joint venture to operate the existing Liberty retail network with Viva Energy owning 50% (non-controlling), and Goldberger and Wieland owning the balance. Viva will gain rights to fully acquire the joint venture in 2025.

As Viva Energy also operates Shell-branded stations in Australia, Liberty accepts the Shell Card used in Shell stations. As of October 2022, it operates 284 service stations.

In late 2024, Viva Energy acquired the remaining 50 per cent interest in LOC Global, and divested a number of retail outlets to Solo Oil Corporation, a new wholly owned subsidiary of New World Corporation (NWC).
