= Bulwer Island Refinery =

Closed oil refinery near Brisbane

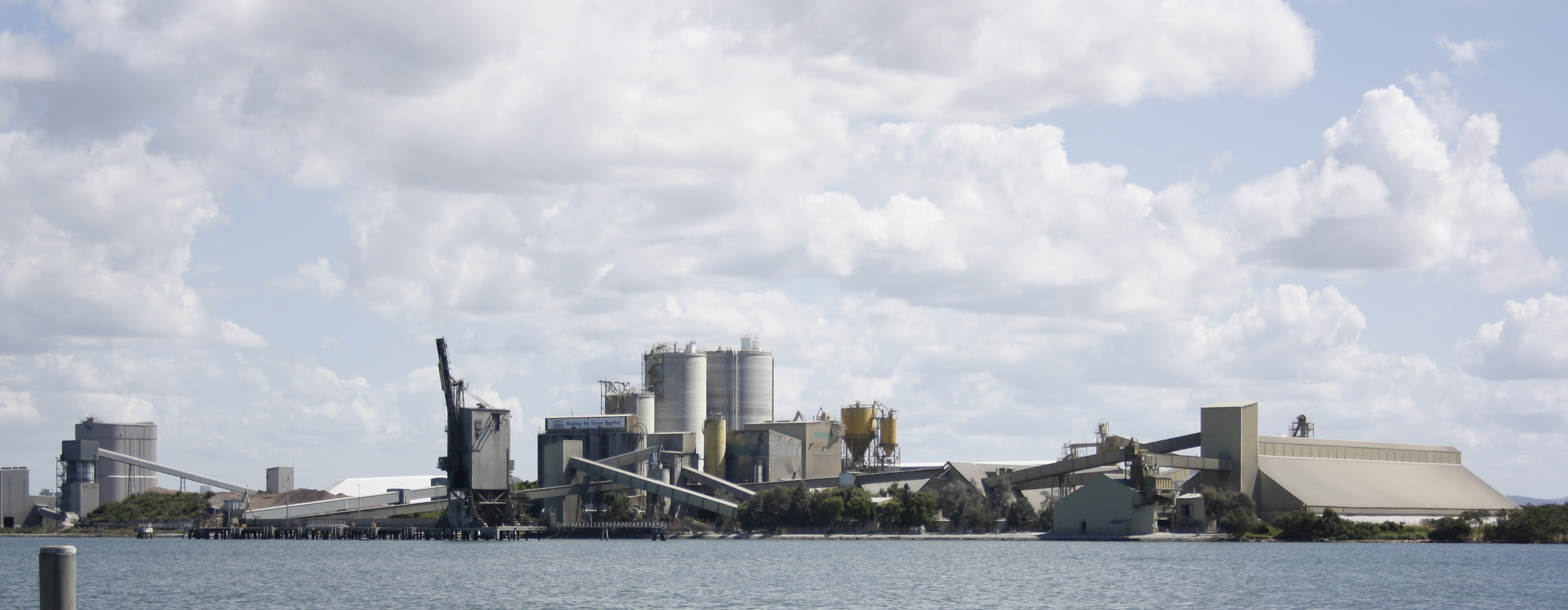
- Bulwer Island as viewed from Fort Lytton, now the location of a fuel import terminal (c. 2010)

- Location within Queensland
- Location: Brisbane, Queensland, Australia; 27°24′12″S 153°8′4″E

Refinery details
- Owners: Amoco before 1984; BP since 1984
- Opened: 1965
- Closed: 2015
- Capacity: 25,000 barrels/day (1965); 80,000 barrels/day (1996); 85,000 barrels/day (2000)

Bulwer Island Refinery was an oil refinery on Bulwer Island near the mouth of the Brisbane River in Queensland, Australia. It is now a petroleum import and storage terminal. It was built by Amoco in the 1960s, taken over by BP in 1984 and converted to an import terminal in 2015. It occupies much of the former island. While it operated, it was the largest oil refinery in Queensland.

== History ==
Land reclamation and refinery construction took place between 1963 and 1965. The reclamation greatly expanded the original island and joined it to the north bank of the river. When it opened, the refinery was able to treat a maximum of 25,000 barrels of oil per day, but generally refined around 10,000 barrels daily, which matched the demand in Queensland at the time. It was built by Amoco and was almost directly across the Brisbane River from Ampol's Lytton Oil Refinery which was built at around the same time.

BP bought the refinery from Amoco in 1984. Before and after the acquisition, expansion increased daily refining capacity to 80,000 barrels per day by 1996. A further upgrade increased that to over 85,000 barrels per day in 2000, and 102,000 barrels per day by 2014.

On 2 April 2014, BP announced that the refinery would be closed in mid-2015, although its jetty and terminal would remain operational. The decision was made due to increasing Asian competition and a strong Australian dollar.
