= Neptune Oil Company =

Australian independent petroleum company

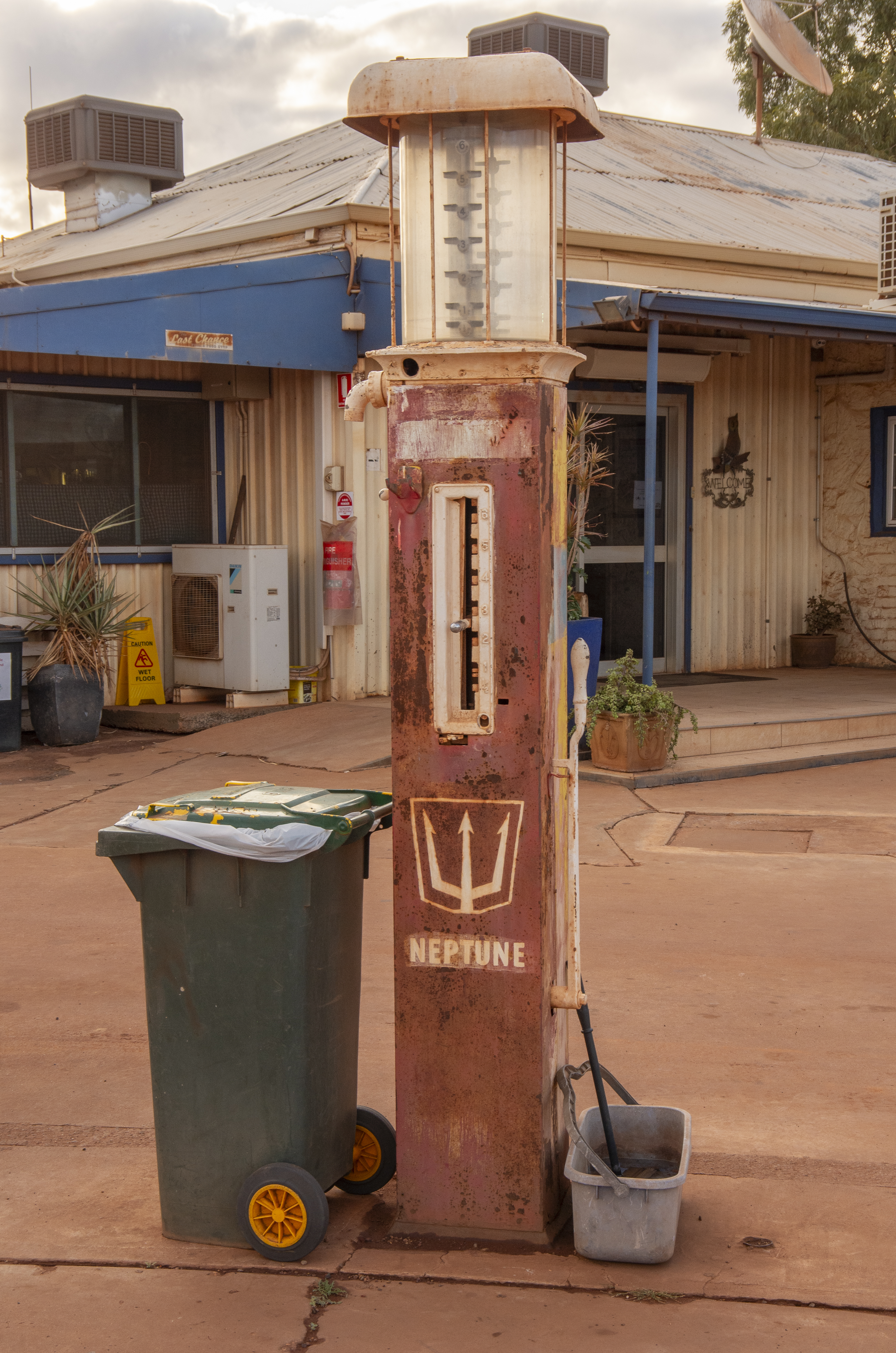
- Neptune fuel pump where it was originally installed in Paynes Find
- Type: Private
- Industry: Automotive
- Founded: Melbourne, 1909
- Headquarters: Melbourne, Victoria
- Number of locations: Australia-wide
- Area served: Australia
- Products: Motor Oil and other related products

Neptune Oil Company was an Australian independent petroleum company based in Melbourne, Victoria. The company was established in 1909 as a privately owned company.

The company was taken over by the Shell Oil company in 1975.

== Distribution ==
In the Australian states, the usual practice was for storage and transport from the local main port, for distribution through the state, with the head offices in the capital city.

In many cases petrol stations with Neptune products were also dealing in second hand cars or other services.

A "King Neptune" statue at a Neptune (later Shell) service station was a landmark in the Adelaide suburb of Darlington until 1991. The King Neptune statue now resides at Wills street Birkenhead, inside the gates of the Shell fuel depot.

== Publications ==
In the print era of the mid twentieth century, publications and promotions by the company were produced extensively in the 1950s and earlier.

Similarly, like Australia-wide oil retailers of the time, Neptune produced a series of road maps.
