= Kurnell Refinery =

Crude Oil refinery in Kurnell, New South Wales

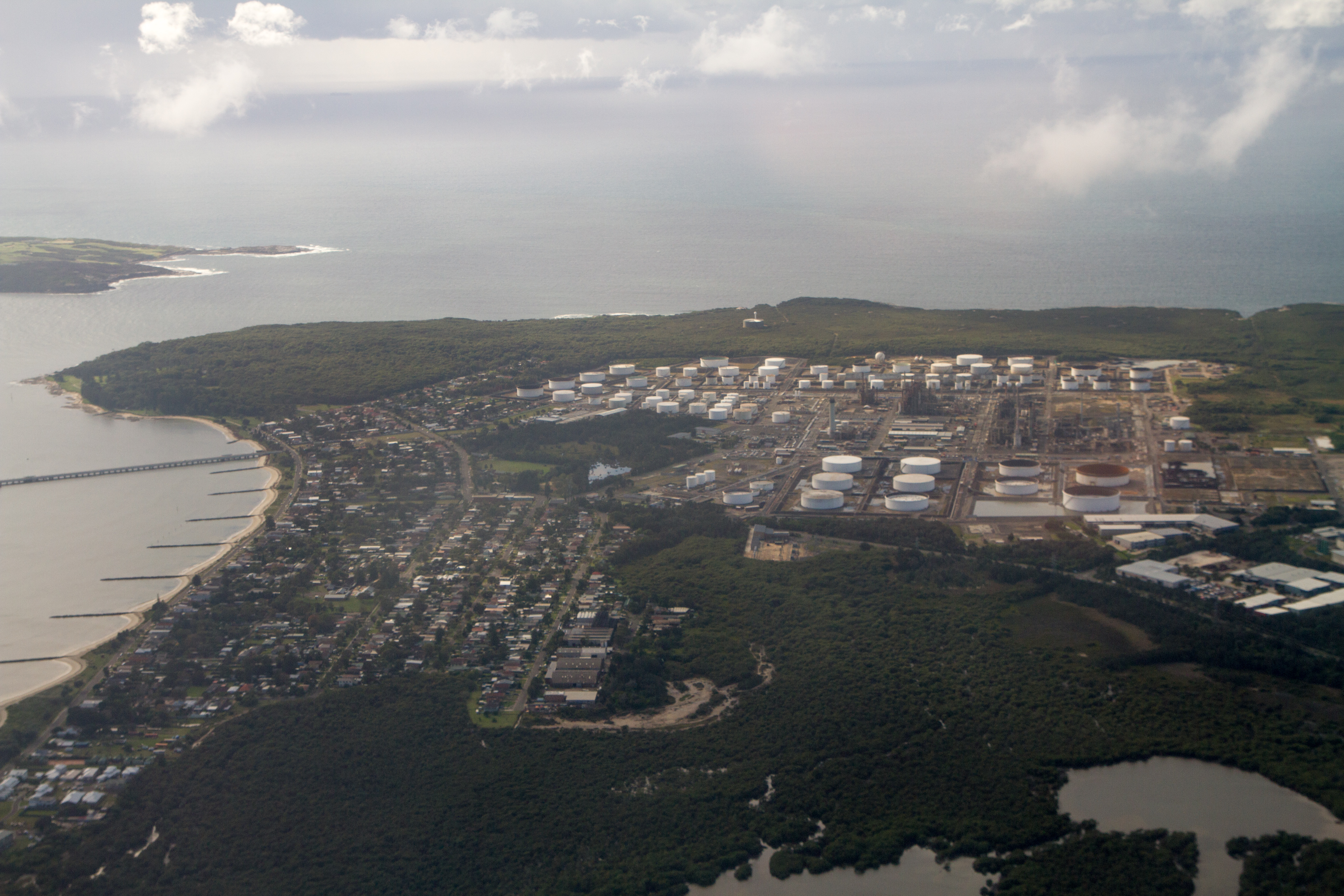

- Location within New South Wales
- Location: Kurnell, New South Wales, Australia; 34.0173°S 151.2164°E

Refinery details
- Operator: Caltex Australia
- Owner: Chevron Corporation
- Opened: 1956
- Closed: 2014
- Capacity: 124,500 barrels per day (19,790 m^{3}/d)
- No. of employees: 700
- Refining units: crude units, visbreaking units, fluid catalytic cracker, light products plants, polymerization plants, amine plants, sulfur plants, impurities treatment plants
- No. of oil tanks: 56

The Kurnell Refinery was a crude oil refinery located in Kurnell on Botany Bay, New South Wales, Australia. It had a refining capacity of 124,500 barrels per day (19,790 m^{3}/d). It was operated by Caltex Australia, and owned by the Chevron Corporation.

== History ==
Construction began on the refinery in 1953. The refinery was built in 1956 by Caltex on 174 hectares (430 acres) of land located in Botany Bay, close to Sydney. About 3,000 men worked at the project's various sites during the peak of construction. It was further expanded in 1964 and 1973.

On 26 July 2012, Caltex announced its decision to close the refinery in the second half of 2014. Caltex said that the closure would eliminate about 330 direct positions, and as many as 300 contracting jobs. The refinery ceased operation in October 2014 and was converted into an import terminal to supply imported fuel for Australian customers.

== Technical features ==
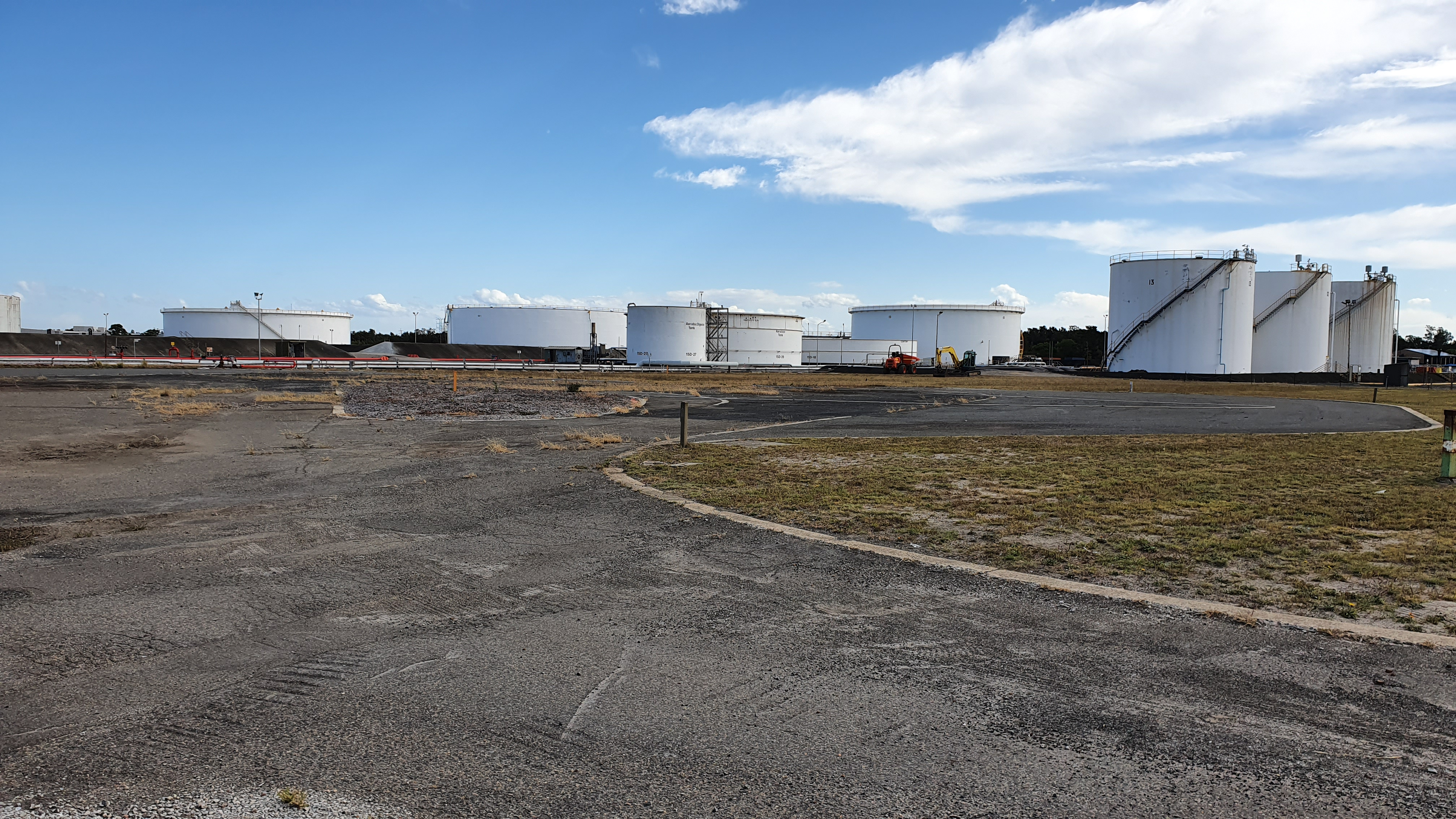
Storage tanks at Kurnell Refinery

The refinery had a capacity of 124.5 thousand barrels per day (19.79×10^{3} m^{3}/d), 56 storage tanks and a staff of approximately 700 employees. The site of the refinery also has a 1 kilometre (0.62 mi) wharf that can handle ships up to 60,000 DWT.
