= Shell Australia =

Australian regional subsidiary of Shell plc

- Type: Subsidiary
- Industry: Petroleum
- Founded: 1901; 125 years ago in Melbourne & Sydney
- Headquarters: Melbourne, Victoria (downstream business); Perth, Western Australia (upstream business), Australia
- Number of locations: Branch office in Brisbane, Queensland; Supply base in Darwin, Northern Territory
- Products: Coal seam gas, liquefied natural gas, natural gas, aviation fuel
- Number of employees: 1,000
- Parent: Shell (upstream business) (Note: Downstream business is owned franchised and licensed to Vitol as company Viva Energy since 2014, many stations otherwise additionally leased to Coles Express ("Eureka Operations") since 2003).)
- Subsidiaries: QGC; Shell Energy Australia
- Website: shell.com.au

Shell Australia is the Australian subsidiary of Shell. Shell has operated in Australia since 1901, initially delivering bulk fuel into Australia, then establishing storage and distribution terminals, oil refineries, and a network of service stations. It extended its Australian activities to oil exploration, petrochemicals and coal mining, and became a leading partner in Australia's largest resource development project, the North West Shelf Venture.

In August 2014, Shell sold its downstream business in Australia, including its Geelong Oil Refinery and 870 retail sites, along with its bulk fuels, bitumen, chemicals and part of its lubricants businesses, to the Dutch firm Vitol, for A$2.9 billion.

Aside from its aviation fuel business which was retained, Shell's remaining Australian activities are in upstream businesses, comprising exploration, liquified natural gas (LNG) and onshore coal seam gas.

Shell holds large reserves in the North West Shelf, Gorgon, Browse Basin, onshore coal seam gas Surat and Bowen Basins in Queensland. It also maintains a substantial exploration portfolio in Australia with major representation in permits and reserves offshore Western Australia and the Northern Territory.

A new head office in King Square, Perth opened in January 2016.

== History ==
Shell's involvement in Australia began in 1901 when bulk fuel handling facilities commissioned by the 'Shell' Transport and Trading Company of London at Gore Bay, Sydney and on leased land in Melbourne, near Williamstown railway station. The arrival of the ship Turbo on 3 June was the first ever delivery of bulk kerosene to Australia.

In 1903, the tanker SS Petriana – owned by the Shell/Royal Dutch joint venture Asiatic Petroleum Company – was wrecked outside of Port Phillip Bay, causing Australia's first major oil spill.

In 1905, the Shell Transport and Trading Company and the Royal Dutch Petroleum Company established the British Imperial Oil Company in Australia as a joint venture. In 1916, Shell began bulk delivery to garages equipped with pumps. In 1926 it acquired the Neptune Oil Company; a year later the British Imperial Oil Company was renamed the Shell Company of Australia, and in 1928 it purchased the Clyde Refinery in Sydney.

In 1954, Shell opened its second oil refinery in Geelong, and in 1959 established a detergent alkylate plant at Geelong and a petrochemical plant at Clyde. Its oil development arm was very active in the 1960s exploring large areas of onshore Australia as well as offshore opportunities.

In 1964, the UK incorporated Shell Company of Australia Limited was redomiciled to Victoria by acts of Parliament passed in both jurisdictions, the Shell Company of Australia Act 1964 (c. xix (UK)) in the UK, and the Shell Company of Australia Limited Act 1963 (No. 7053 (Vic)) in Victoria.

In 1984, domestic sales of LNG from the North West Shelf began, and a year later, Shell and its joint venture partners signed a sales and purchase agreement for North West Shelf LNG with eight Japanese electricity and gas utilities. By this stage Shell had increased its holding in joint venture operator Woodside Petroleum from 21% to 40%. The company is one of six participants and holds a 16.67% equity stake, alongside five other investors: BP, BHP Billiton Petroleum, Chevron, Mitsubishi/Mitsui and Woodside.

== Sale of downstream business ==
In August 2014, Shell sold its Australian refinery in Geelong and petrol stations for A$2.9 billion (US$2.6 billion) to Vitol, a Geneva based company. Vitol operates these assets as Viva Energy, which maintains Shell branding on its service stations under a brand licence arrangement.

== Projects ==
=== Prelude ===
In May 2011, Royal Dutch Shell finalised its investment for the world's first floating liquefied natural gas (FLNG) facility. Shell had explored the concept of a FLNG in Namibia in the 1990s, but was abandoned due to unfavourable economic conditions. The initiative was relaunched in 2007 following the discovery of the offshore Prelude field located off Australia's north-west coast and was estimated to contain about 85 billion cubic metres (3 trillion cubic feet) of natural gas equivalent reserves.

The floating vessel to be used for the Prelude field, known as Prelude FLNG, was still being constructed in Geoje, South Korea in mid-June 2014. Promoted as the longest floating structure in the world, the vessel will consist of a processing structure, measuring 93 metres (305 ft) in height from the deck, that will take in the equivalent of 17 thousand cubic metres (110 thousand barrels) of oil per day in natural gas and cool it into liquefied natural gas for transport and sale in Asia. The hull of the vessel was completed in December 2013 and the Prelude was scheduled to start producing LNG in 2016—analysts estimated the total cost of construction at more than US$12 billion.

In December 2018, production started at the facility. The company has a 67.5 percent hold, alongside investors CPC Corporation, Inpex Corporation, and Korea Gas Corporation.

=== Ningaloo ===
In July 2011, the Federal Government gave approval for the company to drill an exploration well 50 kilometres (31 mi) to the west of the Ningaloo Marine Park. The drilling operation will occur at depths of around 1,300 metres (4,300 ft), the deepest ever in Australian waters.

=== Surat ===
In February 2019, Royal Dutch Shell was granted leases for $10 billion (AUS) towards the Surat project, which it will undergo with PetroChina under the joint venture of Arrow Energy. In December 2017, a 27-year deal was agreed in which Arrow would sell output to the company's Queensland Curtis LNG (QCNLG) project. It will use infrastructure from the company's QCLNG project do develop the biggest coal seam gas resource in the country, which is predicted to speed up the process and reduce the environmental impact.

== Sponsorships ==
Shell sponsored the Shell Aria, a contest for young Australian operatic singers, held in conjunction with the Australian National Eisteddfod in Canberra from 1955.

Shell was the sponsor of Dick Johnson Racing from 1987 until 2004. Having remained as a minor sponsor, it again became title sponsor for the rebranded DJR Team Penske in 2017. It also returned as the official fuel supplier for the series, having been so between 1987 and 2001.

== See also ==
- List of automotive fuel retailers
- List of convenience stores
- Gorgon gas project
