= Geelong Oil Refinery =

Oil refinery in Victoria, Australia

Coordinates: 38.0777744°S 144.3821741°E

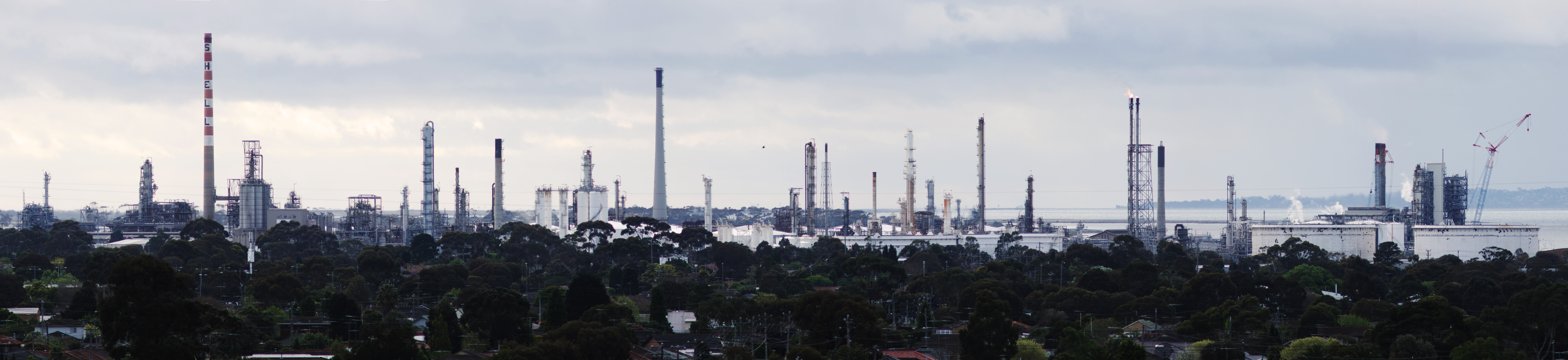
- The refinery in 2011
- Interactive map of Geelong Oil Refinery
- Location: Geelong, Victoria, Australia

Refinery details
- Operator: Viva Energy
- Owners: Shell Australia until 2014; Viva Energy since 2014
- Opened: 18 March 1954
- Capacity: 7.5 billion litres per year

The Geelong Oil Refinery is an oil refinery owned and operated by Viva Energy at Corio near Geelong, Victoria, Australia. In 2017, the Geelong refinery, Australia's second-largest oil refinery at the time, processed 7.5 billion litres of crude oil annually. As of 2026, it produces approximately half of the fuel used in the state of Victoria, or around 10 per cent of Australia’s overall fuel consumption.

The Geelong refinery was established by Shell Australia in 1954. It was sold to global oil trader Vitol, which established Viva Energy to buy all of Shell's Australian downstream assets in August 2014.

In 2021, Geelong Refinery became one of only two oil refineries in Australia (with Lytton Oil Refinery in Brisbane) that had not closed or announced closure within the year.

On the evening of 15 April 2026, a fire broke out at the Geelong Refinery. Fire Rescue Victoria (FRV) was called to the Viva Energy Refinery at 11:05pm following multiple reports of "explosions and flames". No one was injured in the fire. Although the refinery is still operating at reduced capacity, officials have warned it could impact the nation’s petrol supplies.

The various owners of the Geelong Refinery have been fined for a number of industrial pollution incidents over the last 20 years that have contaminated Corio bay.
