= Lytton Oil Refinery =

Oil refinery in Queensland, Australia

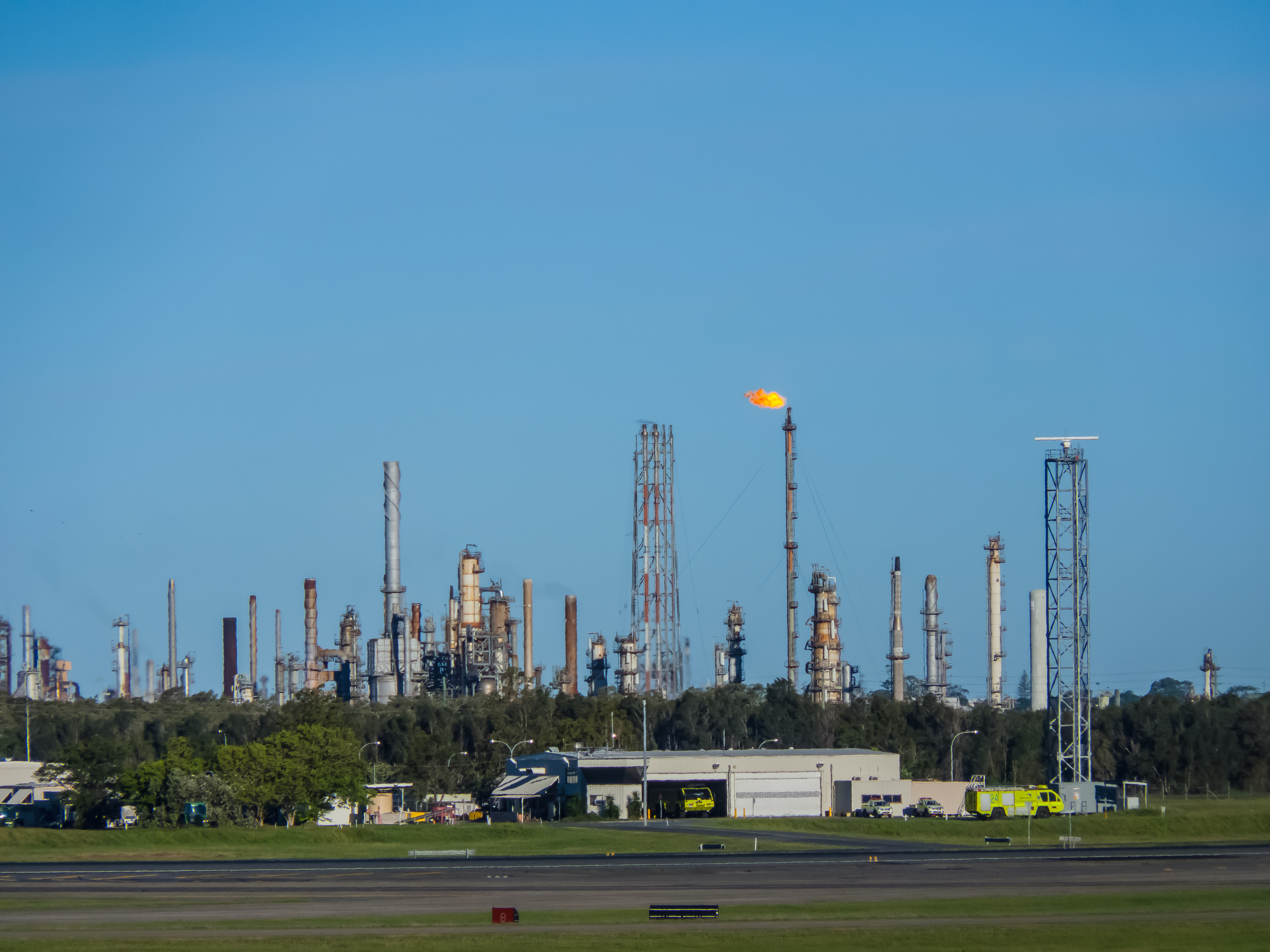
- BP and Caltex oil refineries viewed from Brisbane Airport Domestic Terminal, 2014

- Location within Queensland
- Location: Brisbane, Queensland, Australia; 27.4154°S 153.1575°E

Refinery details
- Operator: Ampol
- Owner: Ampol
- Opened: 1965
- Capacity: 6.5 billion litres per year 109,000 bbl/d
- No. of employees: 550

The Lytton Oil Refinery is a petroleum refinery in the suburb of Lytton in Brisbane, Queensland, Australia. It began operations in 1965, and is owned and operated by Ampol Limited. It has a capacity of 6.5 billion litres of crude oil per year and a nameplate crude processing capacity of 109,000 barrels per day (bpd). In 2021, the facility employed 550 people.

== History ==
Lytton refinery started operation in 1965. It was established by Ampol on the site of the former Fort Lytton. It was almost directly across the Brisbane River from Bulwer Island where Amoco was also building the Bulwer Island Refinery.

== Moonie pipeline ==
The Lytton refinery was built at the end of a 191 miles (307 km) pipeline from the Moonie oilfield. It was the first major oil or gas pipeline in Australia. Construction started in June 1963. It opened in May 1964. It was 10 inches (250 mm) diameter. The pipeline cost A£4,500,000. Following a leak from the pipeline in the Brisbane suburb of Algester, the pipeline was closed in July 2007.

== Fuel security ==
In 2021, Lytton was one of only two oil refineries remaining in Australia, the other being the Geelong Oil Refinery . The refinery operated at a loss of $145 million in 2020.

Twenty years earlier, Australia had eight operating oil refineries. As they have gradually been closed by the companies that operate them, there has been concern as to whether the Australian government should act to maintain a domestic refining capability.

At the beginning of 2021, the government offered one cent per litre of refined transport fuel produced in Australia provided, that the refinery owner agrees to keep it operating for the duration of the program. Lytton refinery did not immediately accept this package while Ampol undertook a review. In May 2021, after the government increased the amount of state subsidies, Ampol accepted their offer and committed to ongoing refinery operations until at least 2027.

== Transition ==
The company plans to move to net zero emissions by 2040 for scopes 1 and 2. Ampol has plans to use the facility to produce green hydrogen.

== See also ==
- List of oil refineries
