= EG Australia =

Australian convenience store and fuel station chain owned by EG Group

EG Ampol
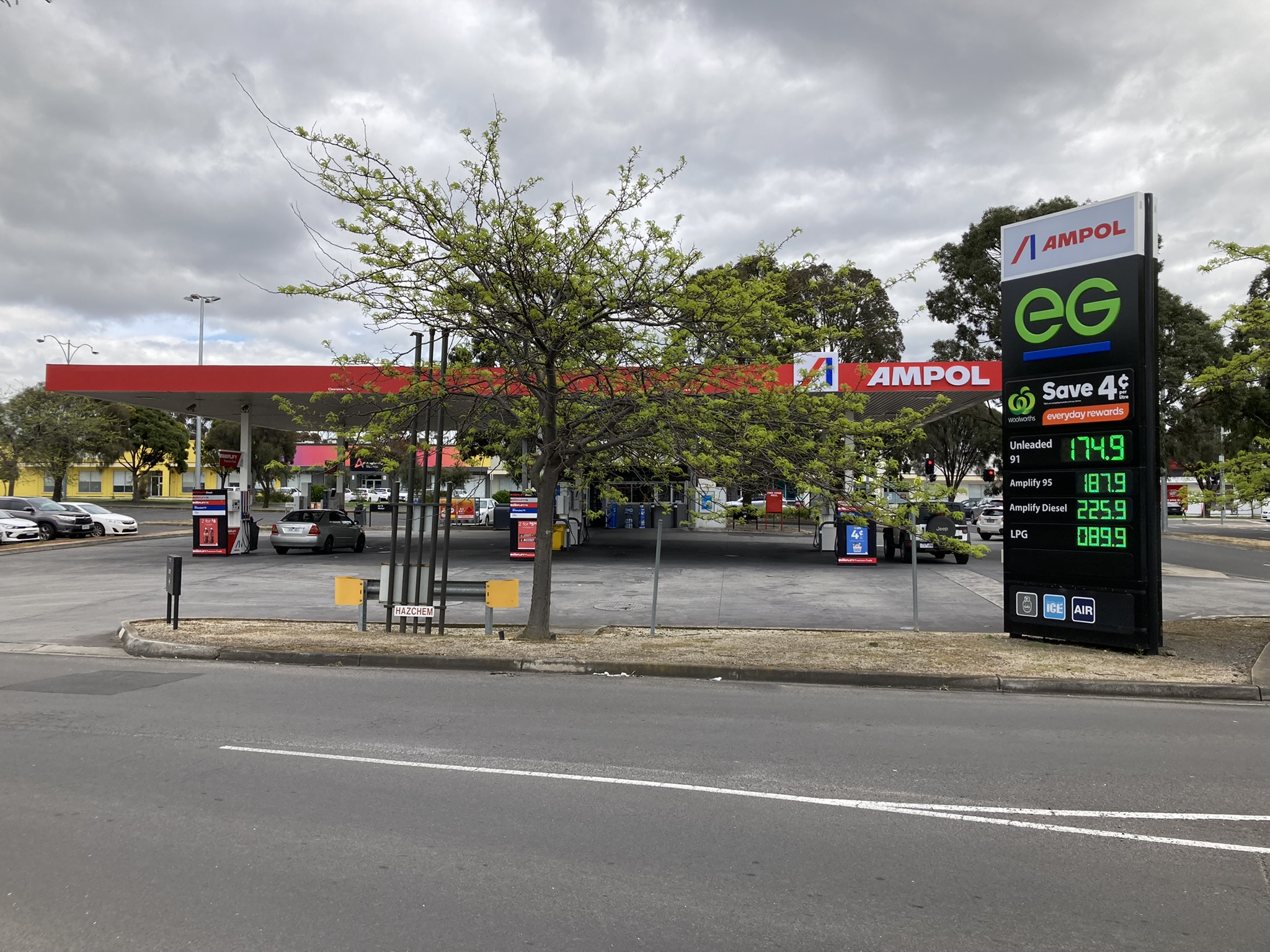
- EG Ampol service station in Sunshine, Melbourne
- Type: Subsidiary
- Industry: Retail and petroleum industry
- Founded: 1996 – Woolworths Plus Petrol; 2003 – Caltex Woolworths; 2019 – EG Caltex; 2022 – EG Ampol
- Defunct: June 30, 2026
- Fate: Merged into Ampol
- Products: Petrol, convenience retail

EG Ampol was an Australian fuel and convenience store retail network.

The business was originally established in 1996 by Woolworths Group under the name Woolworths Plus Petrol. In 2003, it became Caltex Woolworths through a joint venture with Caltex Australia, operating under the Caltex brand. In April 2019, EG Group acquired the business for approximately A$1.72 billion and rebranded it as EG Caltex.

In December 2019, Chevron announced it would withdraw the Caltex brand in Australia, with Caltex Australia eventually becoming Ampol Limited. Following this change, the network was progressively rebranded as EG Ampol between July and December 2022.

In June 2026, a sale of the division to Ampol was approved by regulators and valued at $789 million, on the proviso Ampol divests 41 sites to Metro Petroleum. Ampol have since removed the EG branding from all sites.

== History ==
Logo of the former Caltex Woolworths

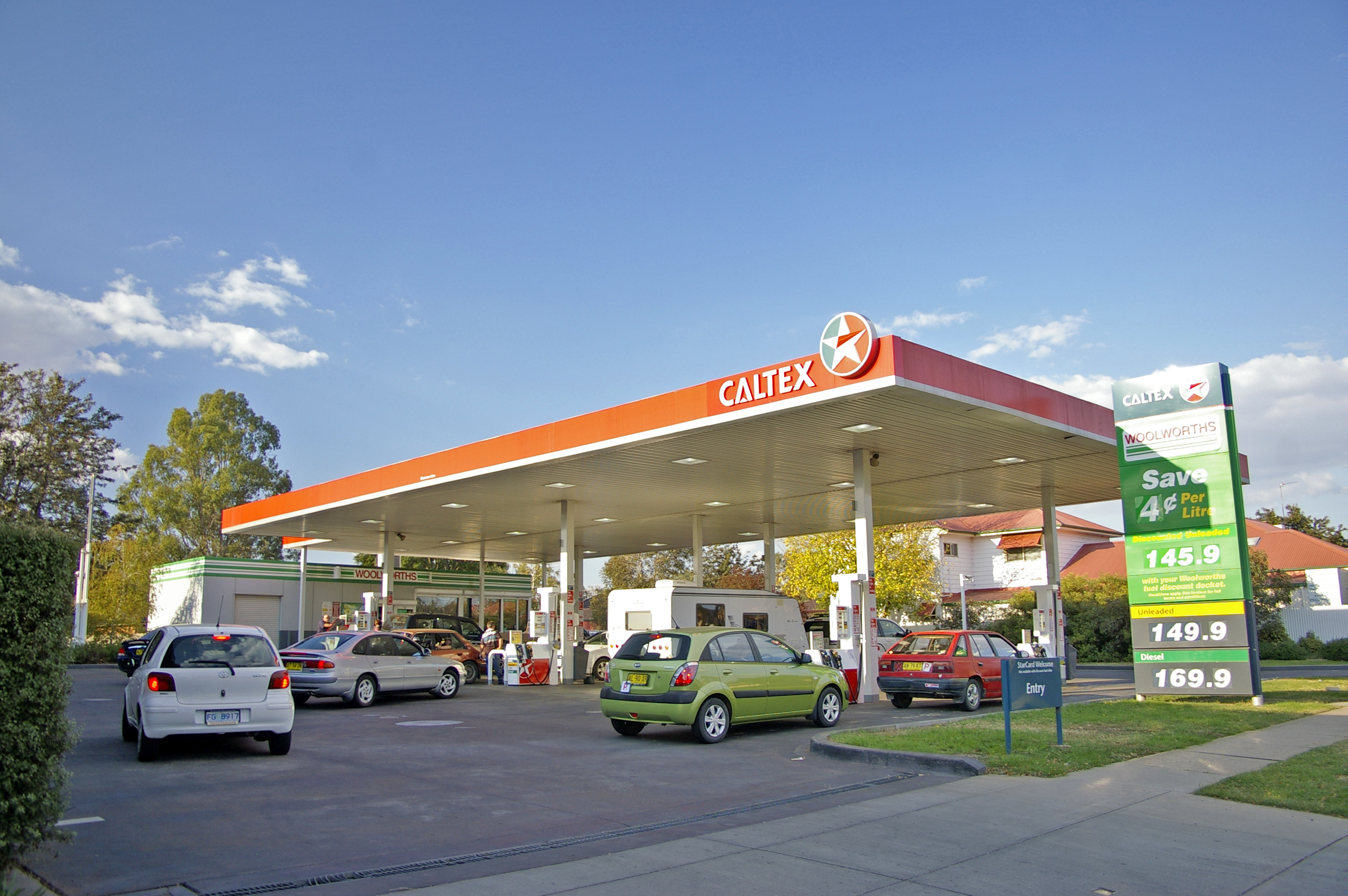
A Caltex Woolworths site in Wagga Wagga in 2008

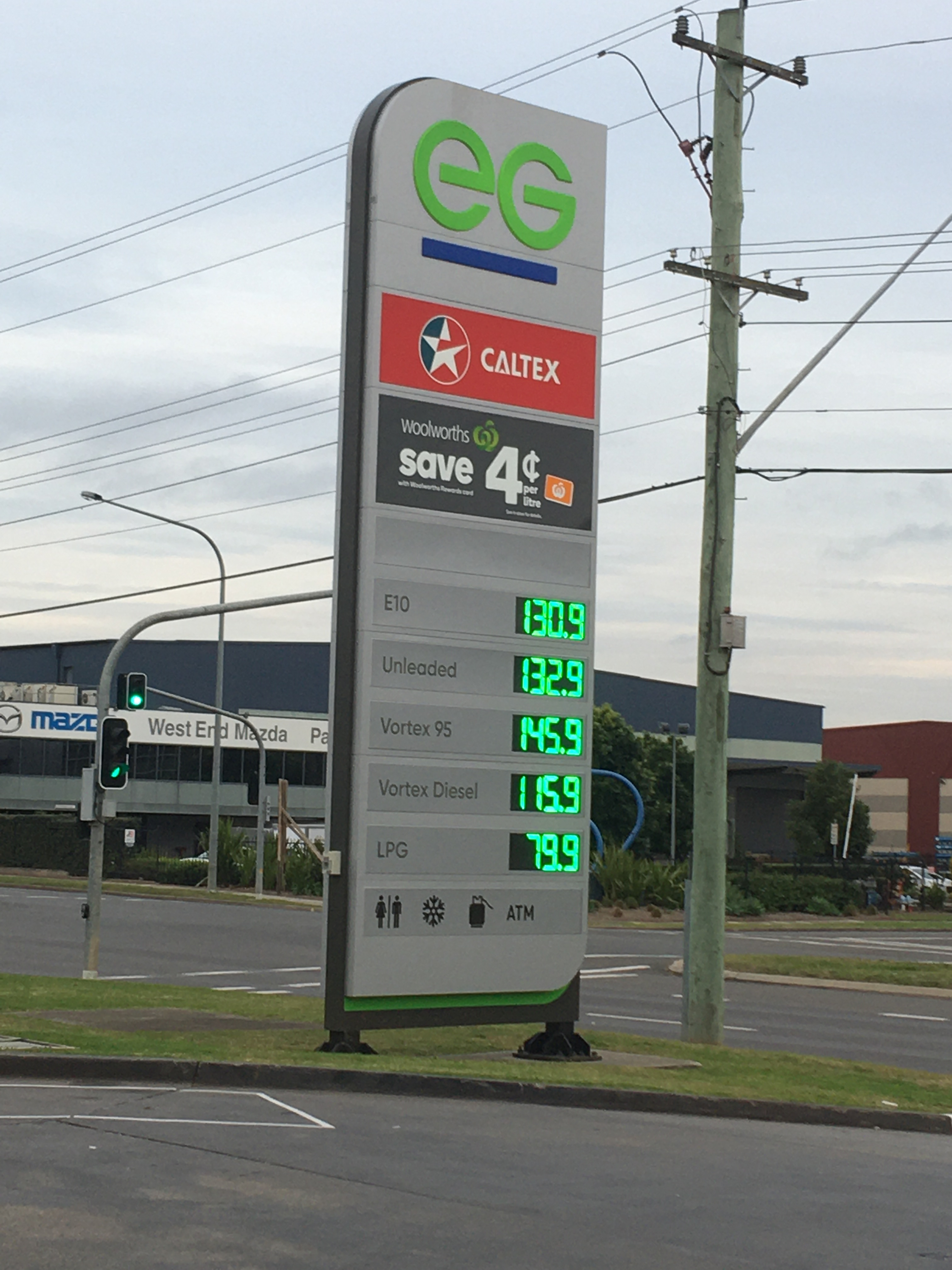
An EG site in Marayong, Sydney, pictured in June 2020, under Caltex branding

Woolworths' foray into the petrol business began in 1996 with a Woolworths Plus Petrol station in Dubbo, New South Wales. In July 2001, Woolworths leased 69 of Liberty Oil's sites which were then converted to Woolworths Plus Petrol. After the conversion, the number of Woolworths Plus Petrol sites increased to approximately 260, equating to approximately 8% market share of the Australian petrol market.

In 2003, Woolworths announced a joint venture with Caltex. Caltex would supply fuel to the outlets and they would be co-branded. All 305 Woolworths Plus Petrol and more than 130 selected Caltex sites near Woolworths supermarkets were rebranded accordingly.

In late 2014, Woolworths and Caltex revised the terms of their alliance, with the changes affecting the 131 Caltex-operated sites. 92 of the sites would be rebranded as either Star Mart or Star Shop convenience stores while continuing to accept the Woolworths fuel discount redemption while the remainder would exit the Caltex–Woolworths alliance entirely. Another 12 sites were added to the Caltex redemption network in 2015 for a total of 104 Caltex operated sites accepting the Woolworths fuel discount.

In August 2016, Everyday Rewards' members could collect points for every dollar spent in any Caltex Woolworths outlet for the first time, in addition to the already-existing fuel discount offer.

In December 2016, Woolworths announced it would sell its own operated sites to BP for $1.75 billion, and would enter into a franchise agreement to retain its branded stores at the sites. The Australian Competition & Consumer Commission (ACCC) blocked the deal in August 2017 over concerns it would reduce competition and result in motorists paying more for petrol. BP pulled out of the deal in July 2018, saying the concessions that would have been required to satisfy the ACCC would make the deal commercially unviable.

On 7 November 2018, it was announced that 125 Caltex sites had begun accepting the Woolworths fuel discount redemption, and 680 Caltex sites had also begun to allow Woolworths Rewards' members to earn points, joining the existing network of 538 Caltex Woolworths sites and 104 Caltex operated sites. Two days later, on 9 November 2018, Woolworths announced it would sell its 540 stores to the British company EG Group for $1.72 billion. Woolworths said it would enter a 15-year agreement with EG that would maintain its fuel discount redemption across the network, and enable Woolworths Rewards points to be earned on fuel transactions across its network. Woolworths would also sell wholesale food and groceries to the chain of service stations under the agreement. The acquisition was completed on 1 April 2019.

In May 2020, Caltex was rebranded as Ampol. In late 2020, EG sued Ampol regarding the latter's rebranding, accusing them of "misleading or deceptive conduct". When EG acquired the stores from Woolworths, it also inherited the fuel supply agreement which allowed the use of the Caltex brand. EG accused Ampol of making "false representations" about the status of the latter's branding agreement with Chevron in that the then-Caltex Australia could use the Caltex brand for a long time. EG also accused Ampol for failing to disclose that the latter was already locked in discussions with Chevron about the future of the trademark licence agreement. The legal dispute was mutually resolved in April 2022 with all legal proceedings dropped. The resolution allowed Ampol to continue to be the exclusive supplier to all EG stores under the agreement, and paved the way for the rebranding from Caltex to Ampol in EG stores. Since 2022, EG Ampol was also partnering with fast food companies to deliver stores in some of their newer sites.

In August 2025, EG Group announced it would sell its Australian operations to Ampol. In June 2026, the sale was approved by regulators and valued at $789 million on the proviso Ampol would divest 41 sites to Metro Petroleum. Ampol would remove the existing "EG" branding and replace with its Foodary and U-GO brands.

== See also ==
- List of automotive fuel retailers
- List of convenience stores
