= William Walkley =

New Zealand oil company executive

Sir William Walkley CBE
- Born: William Gaston Walkley; 1 November 1896; Ōtaki, New Zealand
- Died: 12 April 1976 (aged 79); Manly, New South Wales, Australia
- Citizenship: Australia, New Zealand
- Occupation(s): Accountant, executive
- Known for: Oil exploration
- Board member of: Associated Motorists' Petrol; Ampol (1939-1967); Pool Petroleum; RW Miller (1962-1963); Thiess (1963-1967); Stellar Mining NL
- Spouse(s): Marjory (1919-?); Theresa (1945-1976)
- Parent(s): Herbert Walkley; Jessie Walkley née Gaston

Sir William Gaston Walkley CBE (1 November 1896 – 12 April 1976) was a New Zealand oil company executive. Walkley was a founder of Australian oil company Ampol and was credited with being one of the early pioneers in opening up the North West Australia to oil exploration. In 1956 he instituted the Walkley Awards, the premier award for excellence in Australian journalism.

== Personal life ==
Walkley was born in Ōtaki, New Zealand, on 1 November 1896 to Herbert and Jessie Walkley, who were British immigrants. He spent most of his early life close to Palmerston North, where his father worked as a draper.

In 1917 Walkley enlisted in the New Zealand Expeditionary Force, getting as far as England. Due to ill-health and the end of the war he did not see action in World War I. He was discharged in 1920 having reached the rank of temporary warrant officer.

He was first married at a registry office in Andover, Hampshire, England in July 1919 to Marjory Ponting; this marriage soon ended in divorce. In 1945 he married Theresa May Stevens, a divorcee who had been his secretary, at St Stephens Presbyterian Church in Sydney. His marriage to Teresa lasted until his death in 1976.

== Business career ==
On returning to New Zealand from England Walkley applied to become an associate of the New Zealand Society of Accountants and starting a practice in Hāwera in 1922.

In 1931, with Hawera car dealer William Arthur O'Callaghan and a series of North Island businessman including the Todd Family, Walkley was a co-founder of the Associated Motorists' Petrol Co. Ltd with the aim of providing customers a cheaper local alternative to the foreign oil companies. The company sold petrol under the Europa brand.

=== Ampol ===
In 1935 Walkley and O'Callaghan with the support of the New Zealand Automobile Association and a consortium of New Zealand businessman lobbied the NRMA in NSW to offer to repeat in Australia the model used by Europa. While the NRMA did not endorse this venture, key members of the NRMA board, including former Australian Prime Minister Chris Watson (who became the first chairman), did join the new venture Australian Motorists Petroleum Co. Ltd which traded as Ampol.

Walkley was managing director of the company from 1939 until he retired in 1963.

In 1953 after striking oil at Rough Range near Exmouth, Walkley walked down Pitt Street, Sydney in a red ten gallon hat, stopping traffic. At the spudding of Rough Range he had promised to wear the hat, which had been given to him by journalists in Carnarvon, once oil had been struck.

In 1954 Ampol named its first oil tanker MV William G. Walkley after Walkley.

In 1958, his portrait was painted by William Pidgeon. It is in the collection of the National Portrait Gallery.

== Charity ==
In 1960 Walkley joined the board of the Royal New South Wales Institution for Deaf & Blind Children, becoming president in 1965. During the late 1960s Walkley heavily lobbied state governments across Australia in an attempt to fund a school for deaf-blind children. Walkley remained president until his death.

== Sporting administration ==
=== Golf ===
In 1947 Walkley established the Ampol Tournament. By the mid-1950s it had become the richest tournament outside the United States. Walkley in 1957 became the Australian representative on the International Golf Association. He was responsible for having the Canada Cup tournament held at Royal Melbourne Golf Club in 1959.

=== Yachting ===
Walkley, with Sir Frank Packer, Richard Dickson, Bill Northam and Noel Foley, was a member of the ownership syndicate of the 1962 America's Cup challenger Gretel.

=== Soccer ===
Between 1963 and 1970 Walkley was president of the Australian Soccer Federation. As president he was involved in Australia's reentry to world football after being banned by FIFA. He stated that soccer had a role in bringing Australians together saying that it was "the sport that could do most to bring old and new Australians together and aid the newcomers’ assimilation".

In 1966 Walkley became the inaugural president of the Oceania Football Confederation. He served in this role until 1970.

== Walkley Awards ==
In 1956 Walkley founded the Walkley Awards for excellence in Australian journalism.

Walkley remained involved in presenting the awards until the year before his death despite his ill health. At the 1975 awards he attended in a wheelchair.

Walkley was the great nephew of The Times literary critic Arthur Walkley. It has been suggested his love of journalists came from this familial connection.

== Honours ==
Walkley in 1960 became a Commander of the Order of the British Empire for services to industry in New South Wales. He was made a Knight Bachelor in 1967.

For his service to association football he was in 1999 posthumously inducted into the then Football Australia Hall of Fame.

The Walkley Pathway in West Ryde, Sydney is named in his honour.
