= Viva Energy =

Oil company based in Australia

- Type: Public
- Traded as: ASX: VEA
- Industry: Oil refining, importing and sales
- Founded: 13 August 2014, ASX public listing: July 2018
- Founder: Vitol(as purchaser of the preceding Shell Australia downstream fuel distribution network)
- Headquarters: Melbourne, Victoria, Australia
- Number of locations: 1,522 stores (2025)
- Area served: Australia
- Key people: Scott Wyatt (CEO); Carolyn Pedic (CFO); Jevan Bouzo(CEO, Convenience and Mobility)
- Revenue: ▲ A$26.7 billion (2023)
- Net income: A$713 million (2023)
- Number of employees: >8,000 (2023)
- Website: www.vivaenergy.com.au

Viva Energy Australia is a listed Australian company that owns the Geelong Oil Refinery and is licensed to retail Shell-branded fuels across Australia under a licence agreement. It also owns and retails fuel through Coles Express, OTR, Reddy Express, Liberty Oil and Westside Petroleum-branded service stations.

Viva Energy supplies a network of over 1,330 retail fuel outlets across Australia, supported by an extensive import, storage and distribution infrastructure network, including a presence at over 70 airports and airfields. In addition to manufacturing a range of fuel and other products at the Geelong Refinery, Viva Energy imports fuel supplied by Vitol through 24 fuel import terminals across Australia.

== History ==
Viva Energy’s business has operated in Australia for over 120 years, being formerly known as Shell’s Australian downstream business, which was part of the Shell Group.

In August 2014, Viva Energy was created when Vitol Investment Partnership acquired Shell's downstream business in Australia. Vitol retains 29.9% of VEA shares.

In August 2014, Viva Energy purchased a 50% shareholding in Liberty Oil. In February 2019, Viva Energy took full ownership. As part of this acquisition, a new joint venture was established to operate the existing Liberty retail network, Liberty Oil Convenience. The joint venture is 50% owned by Viva Energy (non-controlling) and the other 50% owned by David Wieland and David Goldberger, the founders of Liberty Oil. Viva Energy will gain rights to fully acquire the joint venture in 2025.

In August 2018, Viva Energy acquired 50% of Westside Petroleum, which operated more than 50 service stations across New South Wales, Victoria and Queensland. In May 2020, it acquired the remaining 50% of Westside.

In late 2020 and in response to the COVID-19 pandemic, which had significant impacts on fuel volumes and therefore refining, Viva Energy worked with the Commonwealth government to develop the Fuel Security Package which provided support for national fuel security and ongoing refining operations as well as investment in cleaner fuels production. Announced on 17 May 2021, the Fuel Security Package (FSP) comprised an industry minimum stockholding obligation, capital grants towards upgrading the Geelong Refinery to produce ultra-low sulphur gasoline and build additional diesel storage and the commitment to maintain refinery operations to 30 June 2028 (with a further two-year option to extend until 30 June 2030).

On 3 July 2023, Viva Energy announced a strategic partnership with the Department of Defence to supply aviation, marine and ground fuel to the Australian Defence Force (ADF). It will see Viva Energy play a key role in underpinning Australia’s national security through supply of fuel to the ADF, both locally and internationally.

Viva Energy had a 35.5% stake in Viva Energy Real Estate Investment Trust (Viva Energy REIT, ASX: VVR). It was sold to Charter Hall and Charter Hall Long WALE REIT on 21 February 2020. Viva Energy REIT owns service station and convenience properties. After the sale, in May 2020 Viva Energy REIT changed its name to Waypoint REIT Limited.

In 2022, Viva Energy acquired LyondellBasel Australia business, rebranded Viva Energy Polymers, diversifying into plastic feedstock manufacturing and marketing for its Geelong Refinery operations.

== Operations ==
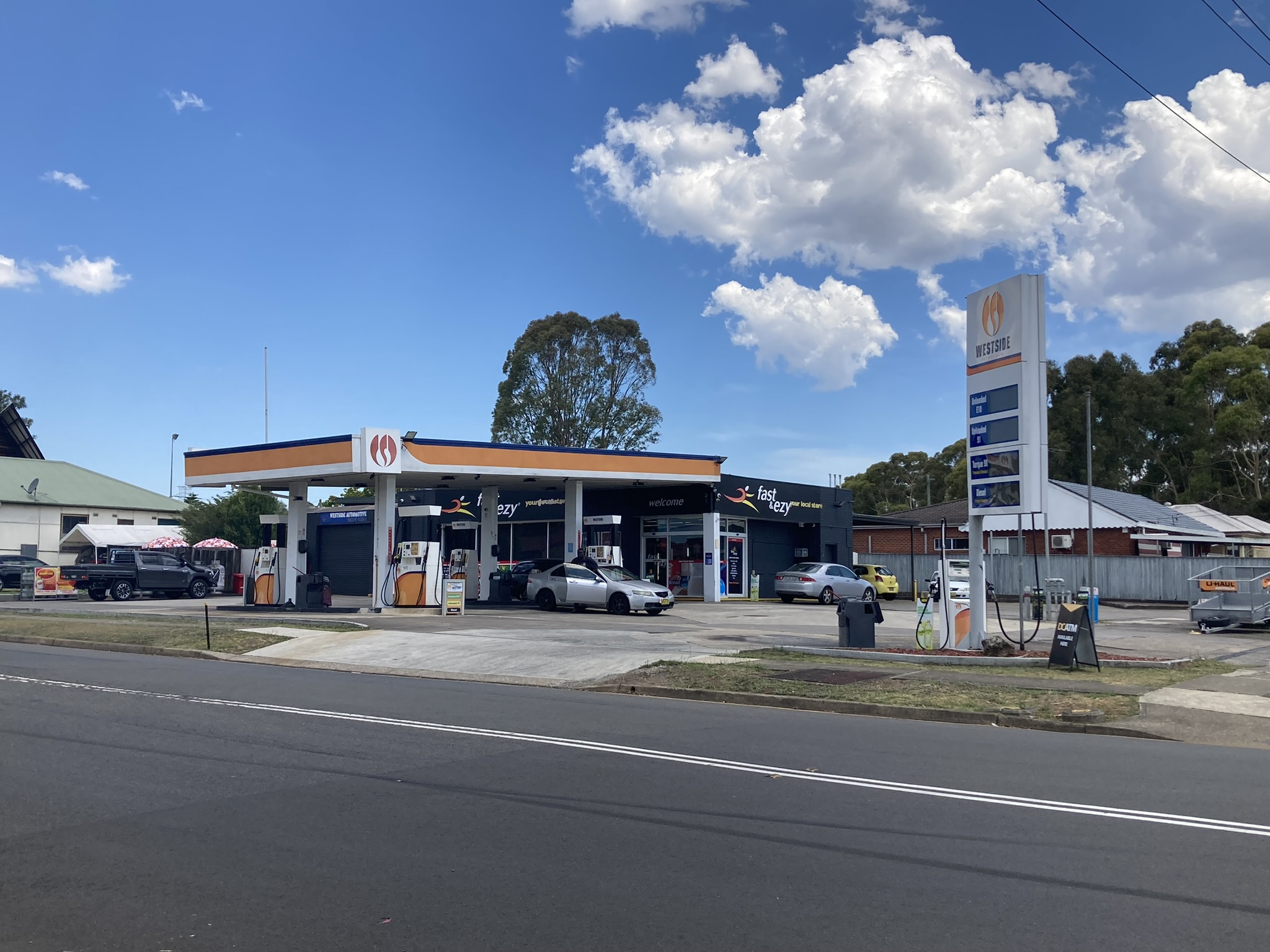
A Westside Petroleum service station at Doonside, New South Wales

=== Convenience and Mobility ===
Viva Energy primarily sells Shell-branded fuel at Shell-branded sites, under a license agreement with Shell plc that expires on 31 December 2029.

In May 2023, Viva Energy completed its acquisition of the Coles Express Convenience Retailing business. The acquisition created Australia’s largest fuel and convenience network under a single operator, with more than 700 stores.

In March 2024, Viva Energy completed its acquisition of OTR Group, which supports Viva Energy’s vision to be Australia’s leading convenience retailer, now owning and operating more than 1,000 stores.

The Shell Card fleet card can be used by fleet customers at Shell branded services stations across Australia.

=== Commercial and Industrial ===
Viva Energy is a supplier of fuel, lubricants and specialty hydrocarbon products to commercial customers in the aviation, marine, transport, resources, defence, construction, agriculture and manufacturing industries. Viva Energy’s position across many segments is underpinned by a national network of fuel supply infrastructure.

=== Energy and Infrastructure ===
Viva Energy has a network of 24 fuel import terminals and a presence at over 70 airports and airfields across the country. Viva Energy supplies around a quarter of Australia’s required petroleum products through its national networks.

The Viva Energy owned Geelong Refinery has been in operation since 1954. The refinery supplies around 50% of Victoria’s fuel and 10% of Australia’s fuel requirements. The Geelong Refinery is one of two refineries remaining in Australia, employing around 700 people.

Viva Energy has a broader vision to transform the refinery site to become the Viva Energy Hub, which includes a proposed gas terminal and potentially a solar energy farm, projects to support alternative energies such as renewables and hydrogen, and the development of strategic storage to improve fuel supply security. In March 2022, Viva Energy announced a project to construct a site in Geelong, which will include hydrogen refuelling, EV charging and diesel
