= Ampol =

Australian multinational petroleum retail company

Ampol Limited
- Ampol logo

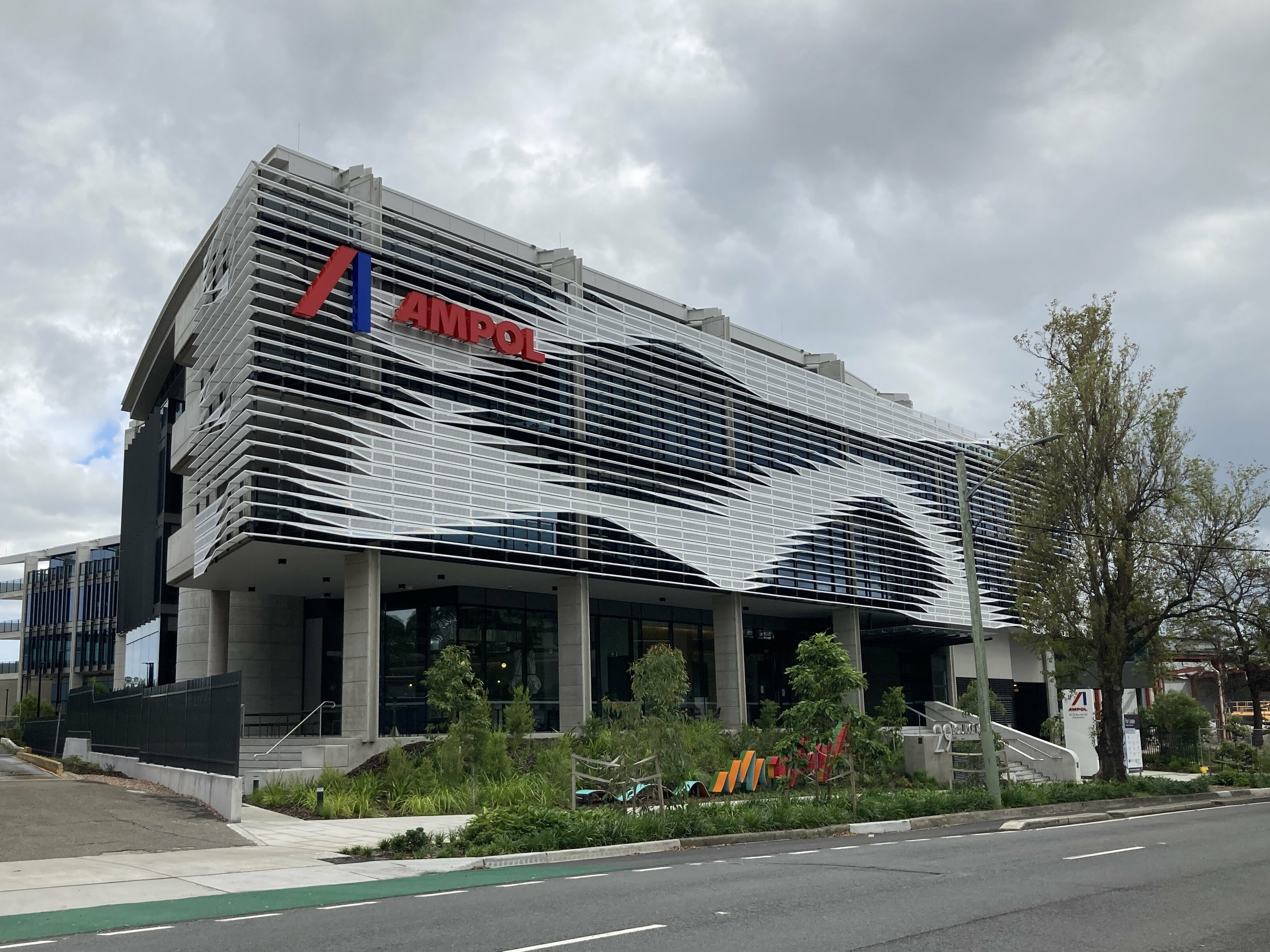
- Ampol's headquarters in Alexandria, New South Wales
- Type: Public
- Traded as: ASX: ALD
- Industry: Oil, fuel and gas
- Founded: 1936; 90 years ago
- Headquarters: Alexandria, New South Wales
- Number of locations: 1,800+ (Australia); 262 (NZ) (2022)
- Key people: Matthew Halliday (CEO)
- Products: Petrochemical products and retail service stations
- Number of employees: 8,300 (2022)
- Subsidiaries: EG Australia; Seaoil (20%); Z Energy
- Website: www.ampol.com.au

Ampol Limited is an Australian petroleum company headquartered in Alexandria, New South Wales, a suburb of Sydney. Ampol is the largest transport energy distributor and retailer in Australia, with more than 1,800 Ampol-branded service stations across the country as of June 2025. Ampol also operates in New Zealand through its subsidiary Z Energy.

Ampol was first incorporated in 1936 and would later be owned by Pioneer International (now Heidelberg Materials Australia). The Caltex brand in Australia separately began in 1941 to market petrol in its chain of service stations and was owned by Caltex Australia Limited. In 1995, the Ampol and Caltex operations merged to form Australian Petroleum, equally owned by Pioneer and Caltex Australia. Pioneer sold its shareholding between 1997 and 1998, and Caltex Australia gained full ownership of Australian Petroleum. Caltex Australia then gradually replaced the Ampol brand with Caltex over the next decade.

From 2001 until 2015, Caltex Australia was owned equally by American petroleum company Chevron Corporation and the Australian public until Chevron sold its shareholding to the public. In December 2019 Chevron, owner of the Caltex trademark, gave notice to Caltex Australia to terminate the licence agreement for use of the Caltex brand in Australia. In May 2020, the company officially changed its name and began to rebrand as Ampol, along with a new logo that was rolled out across Australia between 2020 and 2022.

== History ==
Former Ampol logo

=== Early history ===
Today's Ampol Limited traces its history back to two independent businesses that merged in 1995, Caltex Oil (Australia) Pty Ltd (a subsidiary of Caltex Australia Limited, owned by the global Caltex Petroleum Corporation) and a previous incarnation of Ampol Limited (owned by Hanson Australia). It became the largest downstream petroleum company in Australia. At the time of merger, Caltex Petroleum Corporation was owned equally by American petroleum companies Chevron Corporation and Texaco.

==== Caltex (1918–1995) ====
Texas Company (later Texaco) products were first sold in Australia in 1900. Texas Company (Australasia) Limited was incorporated in New South Wales in 1918, with operations across Australia and New Zealand. In June 1936, the Caltex joint venture was formed in the United States between Standard Oil Company of California (later Chevron) and The Texas Company. Texas Company (Australasia) Limited eventually changed its name to Caltex Limited five years later on 2 January 1941.

The legal entity Caltex Australia Limited originated from California Asphalt Products Pty Ltd which was incorporated in May 1935. The company became public in December 1958 and briefly became California Asphalt Products Ltd, before changing its name to Caltex Securities (Australia) Ltd in February 1959 and finally to Caltex Australia Limited in March 1981.

Caltex Australia opened the Kurnell Refinery in 1956. In March 1981, Caltex Australia acquired Golden Fleece for A$75 million. In July the same year, Caltex Australia floated 25% of its shares to the Australian public, the first multinational oil company to do so in Australia. Part of the proceeds of the offering would be used to pay the acquisition of Golden Fleece.

Until the merger with Ampol, Caltex Australia operated though its subsidiary Caltex Oil (Australia) Pty Ltd. In 1976, through the subsidiary, Caltex Australia sued a surveying company and a dredge operator for compensation, due to the damage to a pipeline caused by their dredge in 1971. The pipeline connected Kurnell Refinery to an Australian Oil Refining Pty Ltd (AOR) refinery under Botany Bay. Caltex argued it had to arrange alternative means of transport of petroleum products. After losing a ruling in the NSW Supreme Court, an appeal was successful in the High Court of Australia. Caltex Australia was compensated even though it did not own the pipeline (AOR did), and while the general rule was that pure economic loss was not recoverable, it was subject to an exception in circumstances where the defendant could reasonably foresee that the particular plaintiff, as opposed to a general class of persons, would suffer loss as a result of their negligence .

==== Ampol (1936–1995) ====
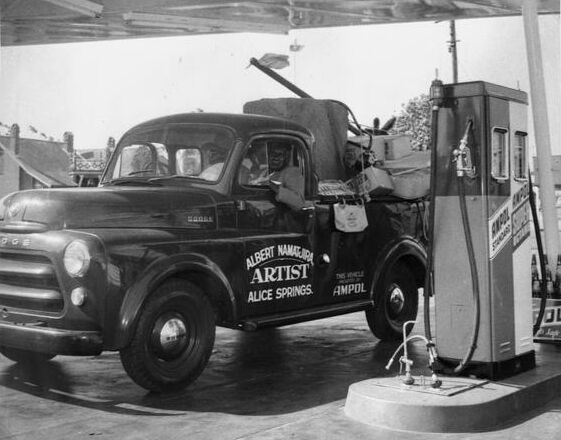
Albert Namatjira at an Ampol service station in Alice Springs in the 1940s.

The Australian Motorists Petrol Company, simply known as AMPOL, was incorporated by William Walkley in 1936 in New South Wales. This was in response to Australians' concerns about perceived inequitable petrol pricing, and allegations of transfer pricing by foreign oil companies to limit their tax liabilities in Australia.

Walkley, along with William O'Callaghan and George Hutchison, approached the NRMA and offered to help it form a company to market petrol. Whilst deciding not to officially sponsor an oil company, members of the NRMA's board sought investors. In early 1936, an advertisement was printed in the NRMA's periodical publicising the float of Ampol. The first delivery of oil was received at White Bay in December 1937 and, by 1939, Walkley had joined the board of Ampol as managing director.

During World War II, Walkley served on the Oil Advisory Committee and the board of Pool Petroleum Pty Ltd, both of which supervised the distribution of petrol. This brought him into contact with Sir George Wales, who owned Alba Petroleum, which had a small market in South Australia and Tasmania. In 1945, Ampol purchased Alba Petroleum in an amicable takeover.

The company listed on the Australian Securities Exchange in 1948, and in 1949, it changed its name to Ampol Petroleum Ltd. The name change was largely to distinguish the company from minerals explorer Ampolex.

The first Ampol-owned service station opened in Military Road, Mosman, Sydney in 1952 with the help of Caltex. Within the following six years, 600 new Ampol service stations were opened. During 1959, Ampol expanded by opening a grease plant at Balmain, Sydney and commenced manufacturing tyres and tubes in Somerton, an outer suburb of Melbourne.

In 1963 Ampol engaged Seven Seas Stamps, Dubbo to conduct a "major national sales promotion based on stamp collecting", in which millions of mystery packets of real postage stamps from around the world that given away free to Australian drivers who purchased Ampol petrol.

In 1965, Ampol's Lytton Oil Refinery in Brisbane came on stream. Pioneer International purchased a 20% stake in Ampol in 1979. From 1980 until 1984, Ampol owned a 66% shareholding in Brisbane television station TVQ.

In 1982, Ampol purchased the marketing and refining assets of Total Australia and changed its name to Ampol Limited. In 1988, Ampol was fully taken over by Pioneer International and delisted from the ASX the following year. The following year, Ampol purchased Solo, the largest independent retailer and distributor in Australia at that time.

=== Caltex Australia (1995–2020) ===
==== Merger between Caltex and Ampol ====
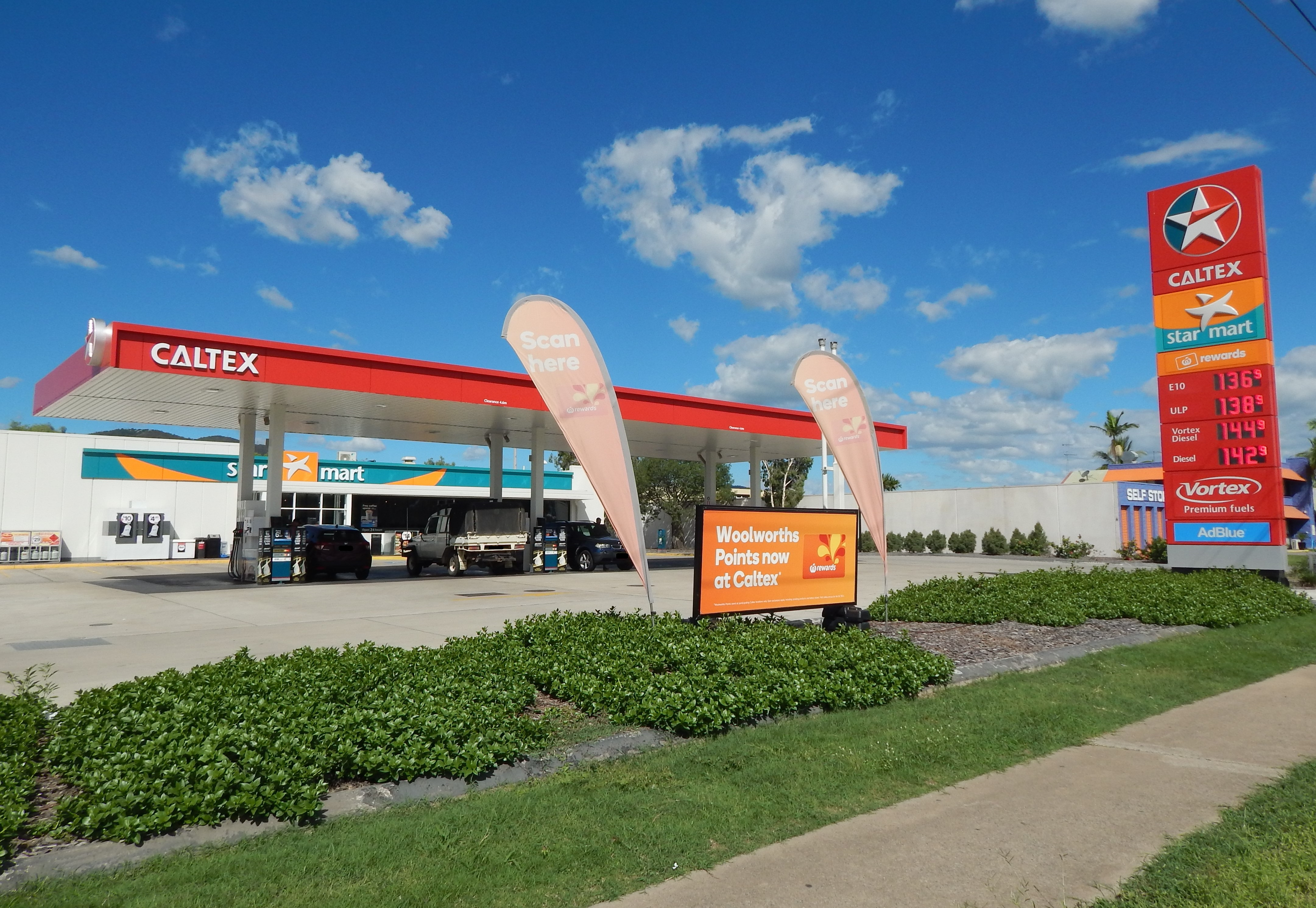
A former Caltex service station in Rockhampton, Queensland

Prior to 1995, Caltex and Ampol were rivals in the petroleum industry in Australia. However, the two companies were still relatively small compared to other petroleum companies.

Despite being rivals, the two companies had partnered up previously. In 1952, Caltex and Ampol established the West Australian Petroleum Pty Ltd (WAPET) as a joint venture for oil and gas exploration in Western Australia. In 1964, Caltex, Ampol and Golden Fleece partnered up to build Australian Lubricating Oil Refinery at Kurnell (not to be confused with the Caltex's nearby Kurnell Refinery). The refinery was Australia's first lube oil plant.

In May 1995, Caltex and Ampol merged their petroleum, refining and marketing assets (i.e. Caltex Oil (Australia) Pty Ltd and Ampol Limited) to form Australian Petroleum Pty Ltd (APPL), owned equally by Pioneer International and Caltex Australia. At the time, the merged company held a 28% market share in the petroleum industry. Under the merger plan, Pioneer would operate the new company while Caltex would be an investor. The Caltex brand was also planned to be retired and replaced by Ampol, but this never eventuated.

In 1997, Pioneer planned to leave the petroleum industry. First, in October 1997, Pioneer announced it would sell its 50% shareholding of APPL to Caltex Australia, finalised on 31 December 1997. This resulted in Caltex Australia gaining full ownership of the company and the name change of APPL to Caltex Australia Petroleum Pty Ltd (CAPPL) on 1 January 1998. In exchange, Pioneer received 90 million Caltex Australia shares (33.33% stake). After the sale, Caltex Australia was 50% owned by Caltex Petroleum Corporation (the global Caltex company) and 16.66% by the public.

Then, in April 1998, Pioneer sold the 90 million Caltex Australia shares through public offering. This meant that 50% of Caltex Australia was then owned by the public (ASX shareholders). The remainder 50% continued to be owned by Caltex Petroleum Corporation. The latter would later become fully owned by Chevron Corporation in 2001. The 50% Chevron shareholding and 50% ASX shareholding of Caltex Australia then remained in this composition until 2015.

As a result of the merger, the WAPET oil and gas exploration joint venture was replaced by Chevron Australia Pty Ltd in February 2000. The owners of the Kurnell lube oil refinery, Golden Fleece, Ampol and Caltex, were under the same ownership, and the refinery was later called Caltex Lubricating Oil Refinery.

==== Later history (1998–2020) ====
In February 1999, Caltex opened an "IGA Everyday" supermarket at its service station in Bondi, to compete with Woolworths and Coles. Also in the same month, the new Caltex branding, introduced globally in 1996, was introduced to Australia. The existing network of convenience stores was also renamed "Star Mart". The Ampol brand was replaced but would remain in use at some service stations, primarily in country areas where customer loyalty and strong brand-recognition were factors.

On 27 May 2009, Caltex Australia announced a proposal to acquire 302 Mobil and Mobil Quix service stations in Sydney, Melbourne, Brisbane and Adelaide, subject to approval of the Australian Competition & Consumer Commission (ACCC). The ACCC subsequently opposed the takeover on the grounds that the acquisition could result in diminished competition. Caltex subsequently abandoned the acquisition, with Mobil entering into an agreement to sell the same sites to 7-Eleven Australia.

In late 2009 and early 2010, Caltex Australia announced the closure of the Caltex Lubricating Oil Refinery at Kurnell by 2011. At the time of closure, it was Australia's last remaining lube refinery. Caltex Australia claimed the refinery was "not viable" because it manufactured "outmoded lubricant products" and faced "declining feedstock sources".

In 2012, Caltex Australia wanted to establish an overseas trading arm to enable the importation of petrol into Australia. As Chevron Corporation already operate the Caltex brand overseas in areas like Singapore, Caltex Australia opted to name their Singaporean business after their former Australian business, Ampol.

Until 2014, Caltex operated two petroleum refineries in Australia: one at Kurnell in Sydney, and one at Lytton in Brisbane, each inherited from Caltex and Ampol respectively. The Kurnell Refinery ceased operations in 2014, and part of the existing infrastructure such as wharfs and tanks would be converted to a fuel importation and blending terminal. The conversion was completed in May 2019.

Between 2016 and 2017, Caltex acquired 46 Milemaker sites in Victoria, including 30 in Metropolitan Melbourne. Milemaker was a Caltex independent franchisee but set its own retail prices.

==== Chevron sale ====
In March 2015, Chevron sold its 50% stake in Caltex Australia (the deal valuing the company at $9.24 billion). However, Caltex Australia was allowed to continue to use the Caltex brand under a trademark licence.

In November 2019, Alimentation Couche-Tard (ATD) proposed an offer to acquire Caltex Australia. Initially declined by the Caltex Australia board, ATD proposed an improved offer in February 2020, and the board agreed to further engage with ATD. Separately in the same month, the EG Group also proposed an offer to acquire Caltex Australia, which was declined by the Caltex Australia board. In April 2020, ATD decided not to proceed with its acquisition proposal due to the high level of economic uncertainty caused by the COVID-19 pandemic, but will seek to re-engage once there is sufficient clarity to the global economic outlook.

=== Recent history ===
==== Rebrand to Ampol ====
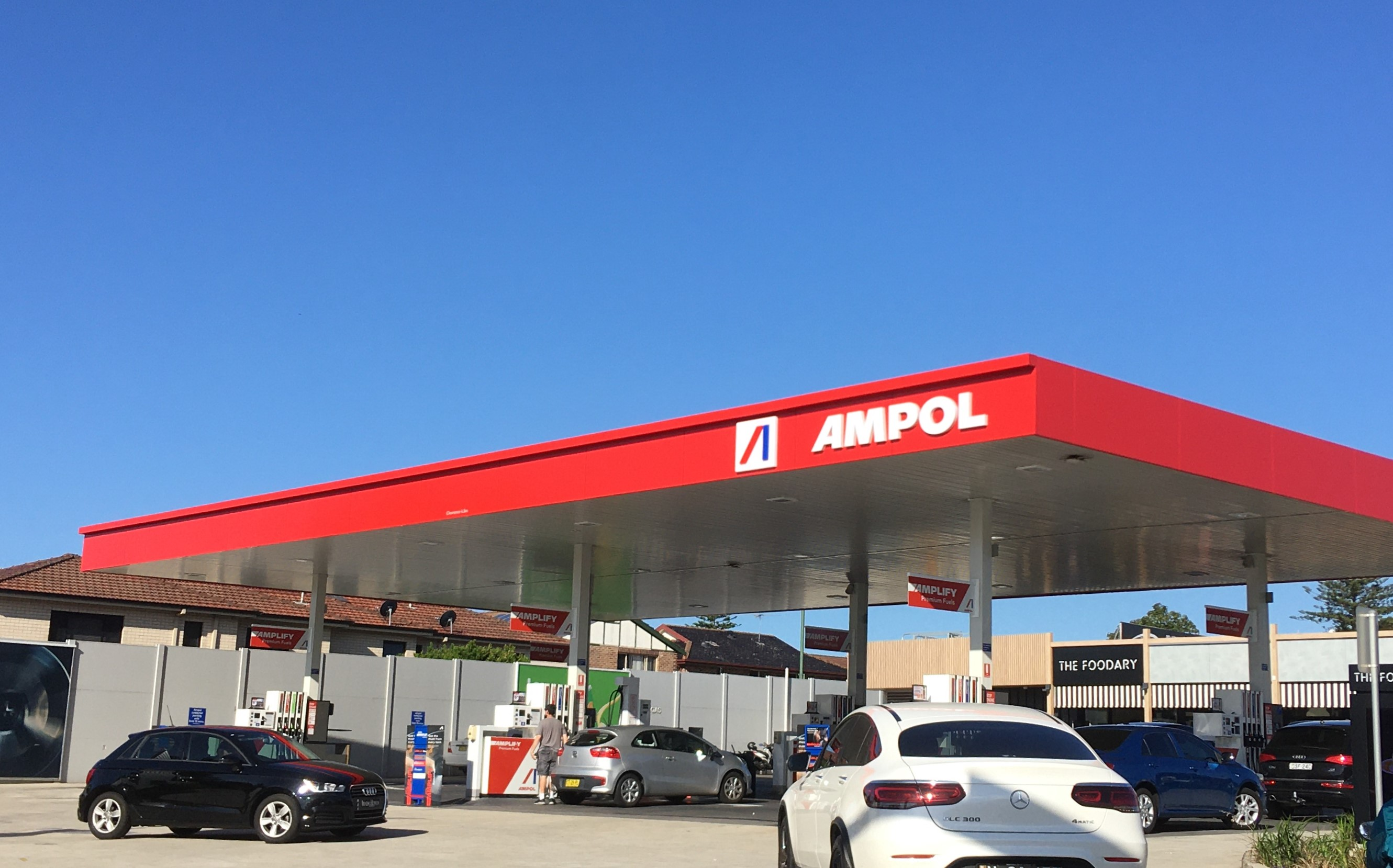
An Ampol service station in Concord, Sydney, the first of two sites that were rebranded

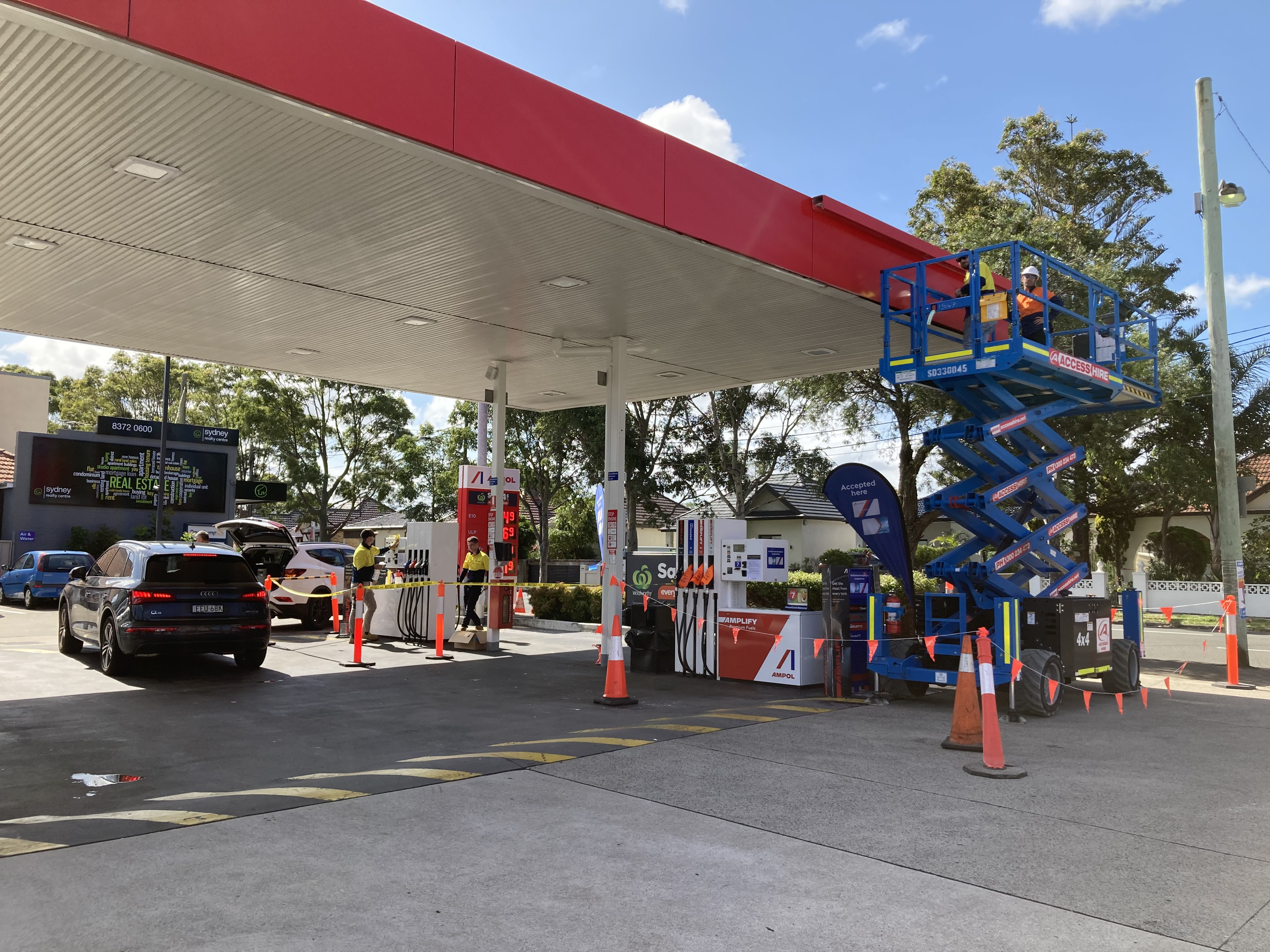
A Caltex service station in Rosebery, Sydney being rebranded in February 2021

After the sale of Chevron's 50% share, Caltex Australia continued to use the Caltex brand under a trademark licence agreement. Under the terms of the agreement, the minimum period of notice required when terminating without cause was six months. In December 2019, Caltex Australia announced that Chevron had given notice to terminate the trademark licence agreement for the use of the Caltex brand in Australia, effective from 30 June 2020. The licence agreement termination followed Chevron announcing it would re-enter the Australian market and acquire Puma Energy's Australian operations and intending to rebrand them under the Caltex brand.

Caltex Australia proposed to rebrand itself back as Ampol, which was approved by more than 99% of shareholders during the annual general meeting on 14 May 2020. Caltex Australia cited continued high recognition and regard for the Ampol brand, and the move was expected to save the company $20 million per year in licensing fees to Chevron.

Ampol would have to cease using the licensed Caltex trademarks thirty months ("work-out period") after the termination of the trademark licence agreement (30 June 2020). The first part of the work-out period was an 18-month "exclusivity period" where Ampol had exclusive rights to use the Caltex brand until 31 December 2021. The remaining twelve months until 31 December 2022 were the "non-exclusivity period", where both Chevron and Ampol could use the Caltex brand at the same time. After this date, Ampol would no longer be authorised to use the Caltex brand. This meant the rebranding to Ampol had to be completed by 31 December 2022.

Ampol planned to rebrand its sites in Sydney and Melbourne in August 2020, followed by Brisbane and Adelaide in October 2020, Perth in November 2020 and nationally in 2021. The Granville and Concord sites along Parramatta Road in Sydney were the first two sites to be rebranded to Ampol on 21 August 2020. The Star Mart store branding was also rebranded as Foodary.

In late 2020, EG Australia, the owner of former Woolworths service stations co-branded with Caltex, sued Ampol regarding the latter's rebranding, accusing them of "misleading or deceptive conduct". When EG acquired the stores from Woolworths in April 2019, it also inherited the agreement which allowed the use of the Caltex brand. EG accused Ampol of making "false representations" about the status of the latter's branding agreement with Chevron in that the then-Caltex Australia could use the Caltex brand for a long time. EG also accused Ampol for failing to disclose that the latter was already locked in discussions with Chevron about the future of the trademark licence agreement. The legal dispute was mutually resolved in April 2022 with all legal proceedings dropped. The resolution allowed Ampol to continue to be the exclusive supplier to all EG stores under the agreement, and paved the way for the rebranding from Caltex to Ampol in EG stores by the end of the year.

In 2021, Chevron also sued Ampol for breaching the Caltex trade mark licensing agreement, regarding the continued use of the red canopy fascia in its rebranded service stations, continuing to promote and accept the Caltex StarCard loyalty card at Ampol service stations, and continuing to use Caltex and StarCard trade marks in conjunction with Ampol trade marks. Chevron argued that these infringed on Chevron's registered trademarks, and that these were misleading and deceptive conduct, and hence contravening the Australian Consumer Law. The Federal Court of Australia ruled that the use of the red canopy fascia was not misleading or deceptive as "no reasonable consumer was likely to think that there is any relevant association between the two entities or that the Caltex and Ampol brands are from the same stable". The court also ruled that the accepting the use of StarCard also was not misleading or deceptive as it was "obvious to a reasonable consumer" that "branded methods of payment may be accepted by businesses that are unrelated to the owner of the payment method brand". However, the court ruled that advertising and offering to accept a StarCard was in breach of the trade mark licensing agreement, in that the use of licensed marks in conjunction with its own trade mark should only be "for the sole purpose of educating customers that it is transitioning away" from the licensed marks. Therefore, the advertising with words such as "StarCard accepted here" or "StarCard will be accepted at Ampol branded sites" was for commercial use and not "for the sole purpose of educating customers". Even so, this conduct was not misleading or deceptive. Consequently, Ampol was ordered to cease using those statements at Ampol stations or in advertising with effect from 2 August 2021.

==== Ampol (after 2020) ====
Ampol partnered with Evie to provide 350 kW electric car chargers at Ampol service stations. In 2022, Ampol also launched its electric vehicle charging brand AmpCharge, with plans to roll out nationwide. The first Ampcharge site opened in Alexandria (Sydney) later that year. In October 2026 Ampol announced plans to acquire Evie Networks for $225 million.

On 17 May 2022, Ampol began to be listed on the New Zealand's Exchange (NZX), using the same trading symbol ALD as its Australian listing. Ampol would retain its primary listing on the ASX.

In August 2025, it was announced that Ampol has agreed to acquire the EG Ampol chain of petrol stations and associated convenience stores. Ampol has also proposed to divest approximately 20 of its sites as part of the acquisition. If approved by the ACCC, the acquisition was expected to be finalised in mid-2026. In June 2026, ACCC approved the sale valued at $789 million on the proviso Ampol would divest 41 sites. Metro Petroleum has elected to acquire those sites.

== Store formats ==
Ampol-branded sites can have any of the following types of convenience store formats.

=== Current store formats ===
==== Foodary ====
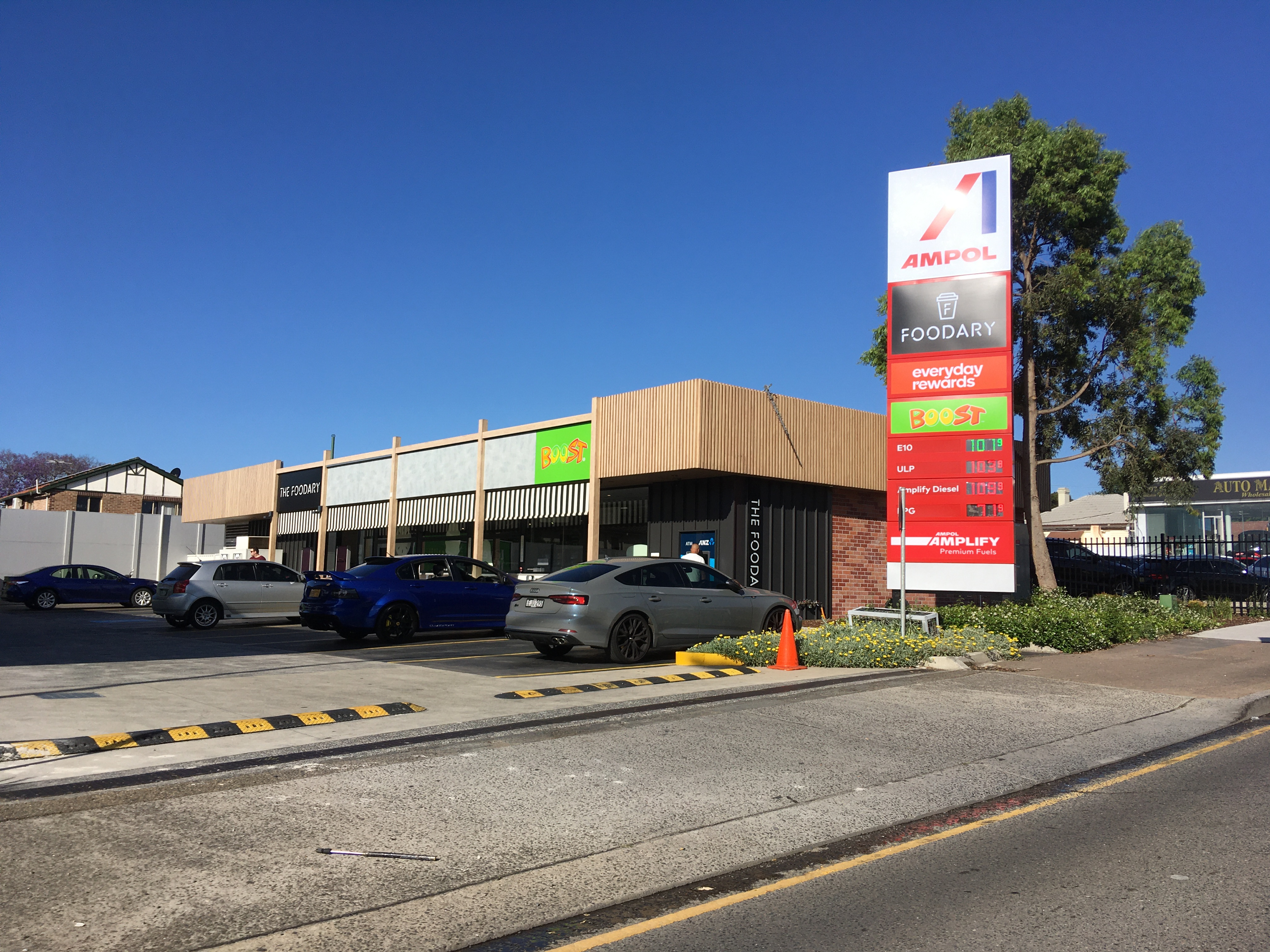
Foodary store in Concord, New South Wales

The typical store format in Ampol service stations. They are usually large sites that contain a bakery, coffee, hot food, convenience items and an ATM. Selected larger sites also offer barista made coffee and fresh healthy food. Other retailers such as Boost Juice and Guzman y Gomez are co-located on selected Foodary sites. The first Foodary store, initially known as "The Foodary" opened in Concord, Sydney in February 2017 as a pilot store to offer a "unique, convenient experience" on food and convenience when refuelling. There were previously also a few stand-alone Foodary stores not connected to fuel stations, including one at Bondi Junction station in Sydney.

==== Co-Branded ====
Ampol supplies the fuel for an external provider who operates their own store format. An example of this is EG Group via their acquisition of the former Caltex Woolworths joint-venture. These sites often display the Ampol branding (and previously Caltex branding) on both the pylon signs and canopy with the convenience store using its own branding.

==== EG Ampol ====
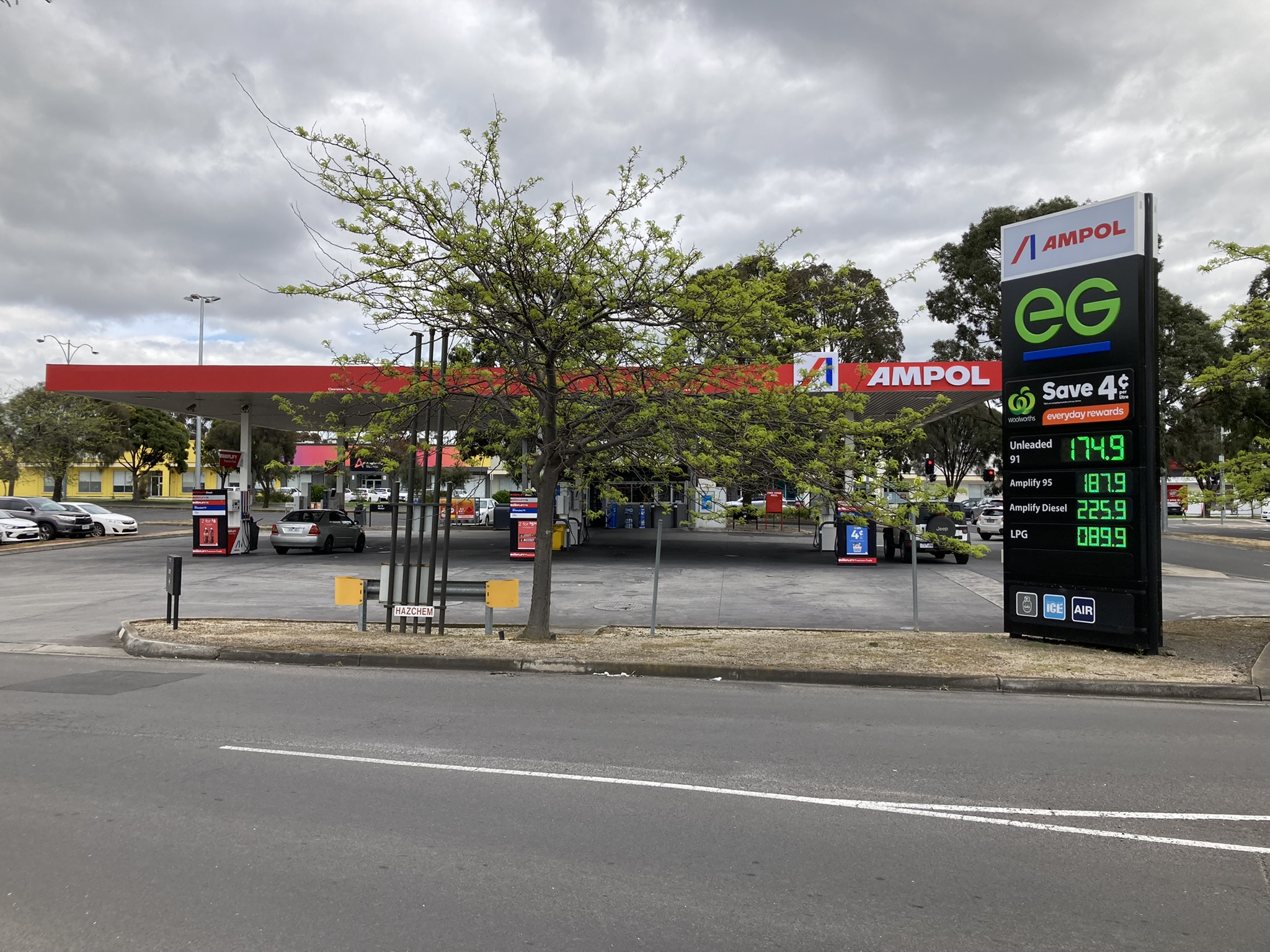
An EG Ampol service station in Sunshine, Melbourne

In 2003, Caltex Australia entered into a joint venture agreement with large supermarket retailer Woolworths. Shortly after in 2004, a similar fuel discount offer was launched by rival Coles Group. Woolworths' existing Plus Petrol service stations received Caltex branding and, similarly, Caltex service stations received Woolworths branding—the joint venture outlets became Caltex Woolworths. However, this was the case only with certain Caltex service stations close to Woolworths and many remain unassociated with the fuel discount offer until November 2018, when 125 Caltex-operated sites also began to accept the fuel discount offer.

In April 2019, Woolworths sold all its 540 fuel stores to EG Group. They were rebranded to EG Ampol. As part of the sale, Woolworths fuel discount offers and collection of Woolworths Rewards points would be continued by EG Group for 15 years.

Following the rebranding, all 540 EG Ampol sites, alongside 210 participating Ampol Foodary sites, continues to accept the four cents per litre discount petrol offer from Woolworths. Since 2022, EG Ampol was also partnering with fast food companies to deliver stores in some of their newer sites. As of July 2026, Ampol has increased the number of Ampol Foodary locations accepting the Woolworths four cents per litre discount petrol offer to over 450 participating locations as part of Ampol's acquisition of EG Australia.

In 2025 Ampol announced it would acquire EG Australia. In 2026 the acquisition was approved by the ACCC, with Metro Petroleum electing to acquire 41 sites deemed anticompetitive. The acquisition was formally completed on 30 June 2026.

=== Defunct store formats ===
==== Ampol Woolworths MetroGo ====
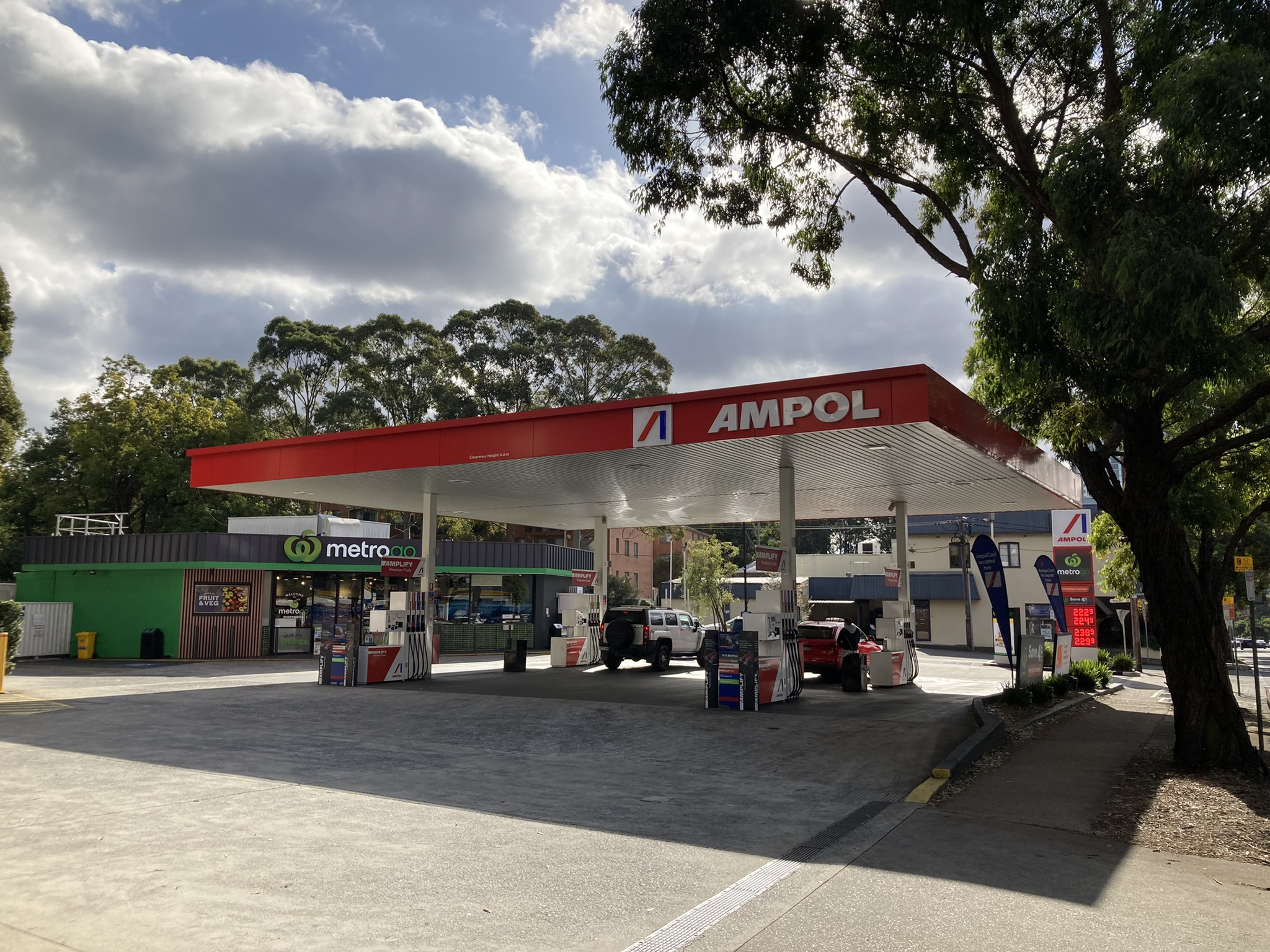
An Ampol service station with a Woolworths MetroGo store in Chatswood, Sydney

Ampol Woolworths MetroGo was a mini Woolworths convenience store offering a smaller range of items such as fresh food found at the major Woolworths, along with offering coffee. Some sites also contained a co-located Boost Juice outlet. Ampol Woolworths MetroGo was owned and operated by Ampol and was not part of EG Australia. Prior to March 2022, they were previously known simply as Ampol Woolworths Metro stores. On 21 August 2023, Ampol announced in their 2023 Half Year Results presentation that all 50 Ampol Woolworths MetroGo stores would be rebranded to Ampol Foodary. The rebranding had since been completed.

==== Caltex Star Mart ====
Prior to the rebranding to Ampol, service stations could also have Caltex's Star Mart and Star Shop convenience store formats, which were converted to Woolworths MetroGo or Foodary during the Ampol rebranding.

==== Caltex Star Shop ====
Caltex Star Shop was a smaller version of Caltex Star Mart with just convenience items and packaged foods and limited operating hours. The Woolworths MetroGo part would later be rebranded to Ampol Foodary in 2023.

== Operations ==
=== Management ===
Julian Segal was the CEO of Caltex Australia for almost 11 years from July 2009 until 2 March 2020. CFO Matthew Halliday was appointed as interim CEO until he was appointed permanent CEO of Ampol on 29 June 2020.

=== Oil refineries ===
After the closure of Kurnell Refinery for conversion in 2014, the only Ampol oil refinery remaining in Australia is the Lytton Oil Refinery.

=== Fuel brand ===
The Vortex fuel brand was launched internationally across Caltex in 1999, and to Caltex Australia in August 2000. After Techron was launched across Caltex in 2006, Caltex Australia continued to sell Vortex fuels instead of Techron.

As part of the rebranding to Ampol, the Vortex fuel brand was replaced by Amplify.

=== Service stations ===
As of June 2025, there are more than 1,800 Ampol-branded service stations across Australia, including those operated by EG Australia.

Additionally, since late 2023, Ampol have been converting some sites to a new self-serve fuel service known as U-Go. The brand has been introduced on sites across Australia and New Zealand. Within Australia, the conversions have been happening in New South Wales, Queensland, Victoria, South Australia and Western Australia.

=== Current subsidiaries ===
==== Ampol Singapore ====
In 2012, Caltex Australia wanted to establish an overseas trading arm to enable the importation of petrol into Australia. This was largely due to the decision to close Kurnell Refinery. As Chevron Corporation already operate the Caltex brand overseas in areas like Singapore, Caltex Australia opted to name their Singaporean business after their former Australian business, Ampol. It commenced trading in October 2013, and the Kurnell Refinery closed in 2014.

==== Seaoil ====
In December 2017, Caltex Australia entered a strategic partnership with Seaoil, the leading independent fuel company in the Philippines. As part of the partnership, Caltex Australia would supply oil to Seaoil via Ampol Singapore, while Caltex Australia would take up a 20% equity interest in Seaoil. The acquisition of the 20% equity interest was completed in March 2018.

==== Z Energy ====
In August 2021, Ampol launched a takeover bid for New Zealand fuel distributor Z Energy for NZ$2 billion. In May 2022, the takeover was completed. Z Energy operates more than 300 service stations under the Z Energy and Caltex brands, the latter of which is under a 5-year licensing agreement with Chevron renewed in March 2022.

=== Former subsidiaries ===
==== Gull New Zealand ====
In July 2017, Caltex Australia acquired Gull New Zealand for NZ$340 million (approximately A$325 million). In the year 2018, Gull contributed to Caltex Australia's 39% increase in international fuel sales volumes to 3.5 billion litres.

After Ampol had announced its takeover bid of Z Energy, in March 2022, Ampol agreed to an outright sale to Australian investment firm Allegro Funds for $572 million, in order to get Commerce Commission approval to buy Z Energy. The sale was conditional on the Z Energy purchase being approved, and proceeds from the sale would be used to fund the Z Energy purchase. Ampol agreed to continue supply Gull with petrol for five years following the sale. Allegro Funds expressed an interest in expanding Gull.

== Other investments ==
In 2016, Caltex Australia invested A$2.5 million in startup Car Next Door, a peer-to-peer car sharing platform. Ampol sold its 17.2% interest for A$16.7 million on 24 December 2021.

== Sponsorship ==
=== Professional tennis ===
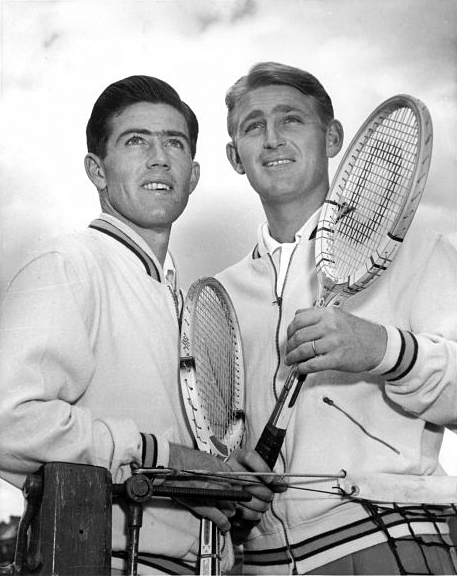
Ken Rosewall (left) and Lew Hoad

In the late 1950s, Ampol sponsored professional tennis events. The Ampol Tournament of Champions was held at White City Stadium in Sydney in 1957 (won by Pancho Segura), at Kooyong Stadium in Melbourne in 1958 (won by Lew Hoad), and at White City Stadium in Sydney in 1959 (won by Pancho Gonzales).

In 1959/1960, the Ampol Open Trophy and bonus prize was presented to the winner of a 15-tournament world series of tennis tournaments which included all 12 of Jack Kramer's professional players. The Ampol Open Trophy was presented at Kooyong Stadium on 2 January 1960 to Hoad, acclaimed "the world's top professional tennis player" for accumulating the most points in the 15 tournaments. Venues for the tournaments included the Forest Hills stadium (grass court) in New York City, Roland Garros stadium (red clay) in Paris, Wembley Arena (wood surface) in London, White City stadium (grass court) in Sydney, Kooyong Stadium (grass court) in Melbourne, the Los Angeles Tennis Club (cement) in Los Angeles, and the Toronto Lawn Tennis Club (red clay) in Toronto.

=== Professional golf ===
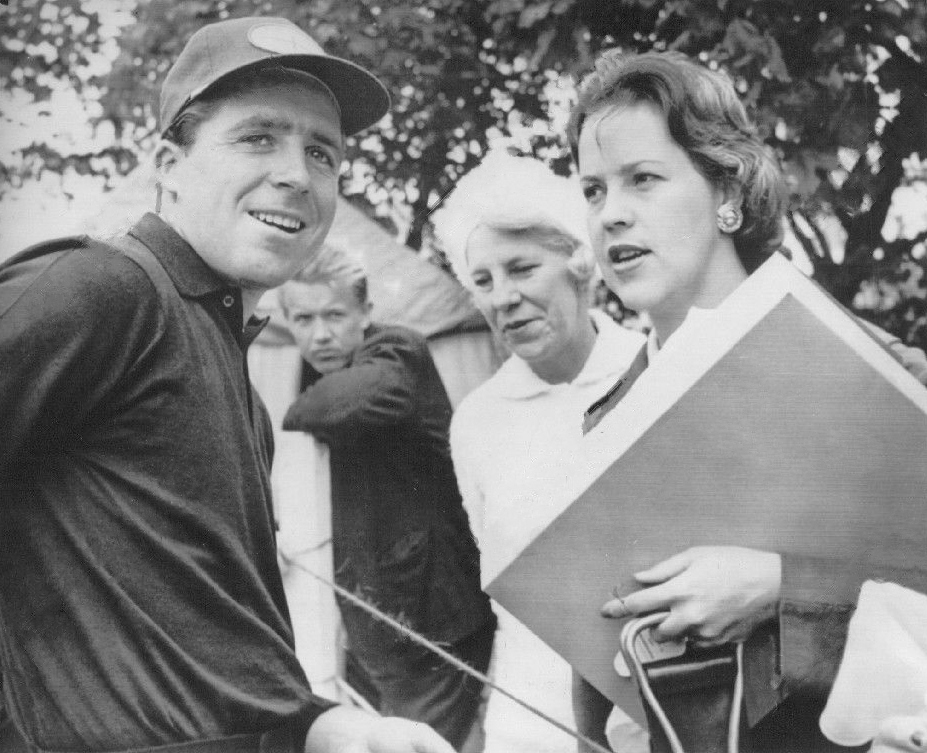
Player with his wife (holding object) and her mother, who were his dedicated supporters at golf tournaments, 1961

Ampol sponsored a professional golf tournament, the Ampol Tournament, between 1947 and 1959 which was the richest golf event outside the U.S. Winners included Gary Player, a three-time winner in 1956, 1957, and 1959, and Peter Thomson in 1954.

=== Rugby league ===
During the 1980s and early 1990s, Caltex was the naming rights sponsor of Endeavour Field, the home ground of the Cronulla-Sutherland Sharks, which is on the road to its Kurnell Refinery. In 2020, Ampol was announced as the sponsor of the State of Origin series until 2023. The naming rights was continued for the 2024 series.

=== Motor racing ===
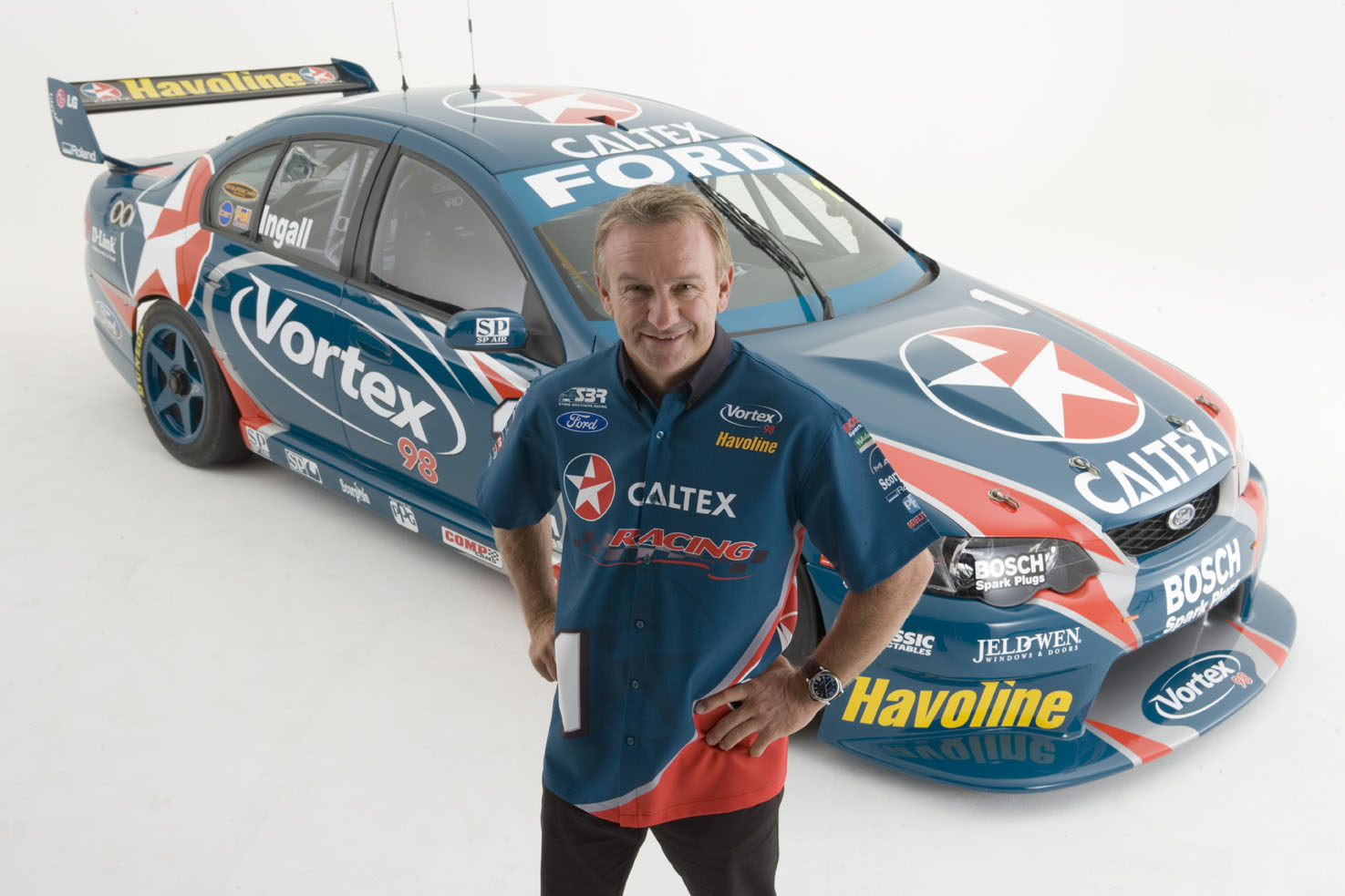
The Caltex-sponsored Ford Falcon BA of Russell Ingall in 2006.

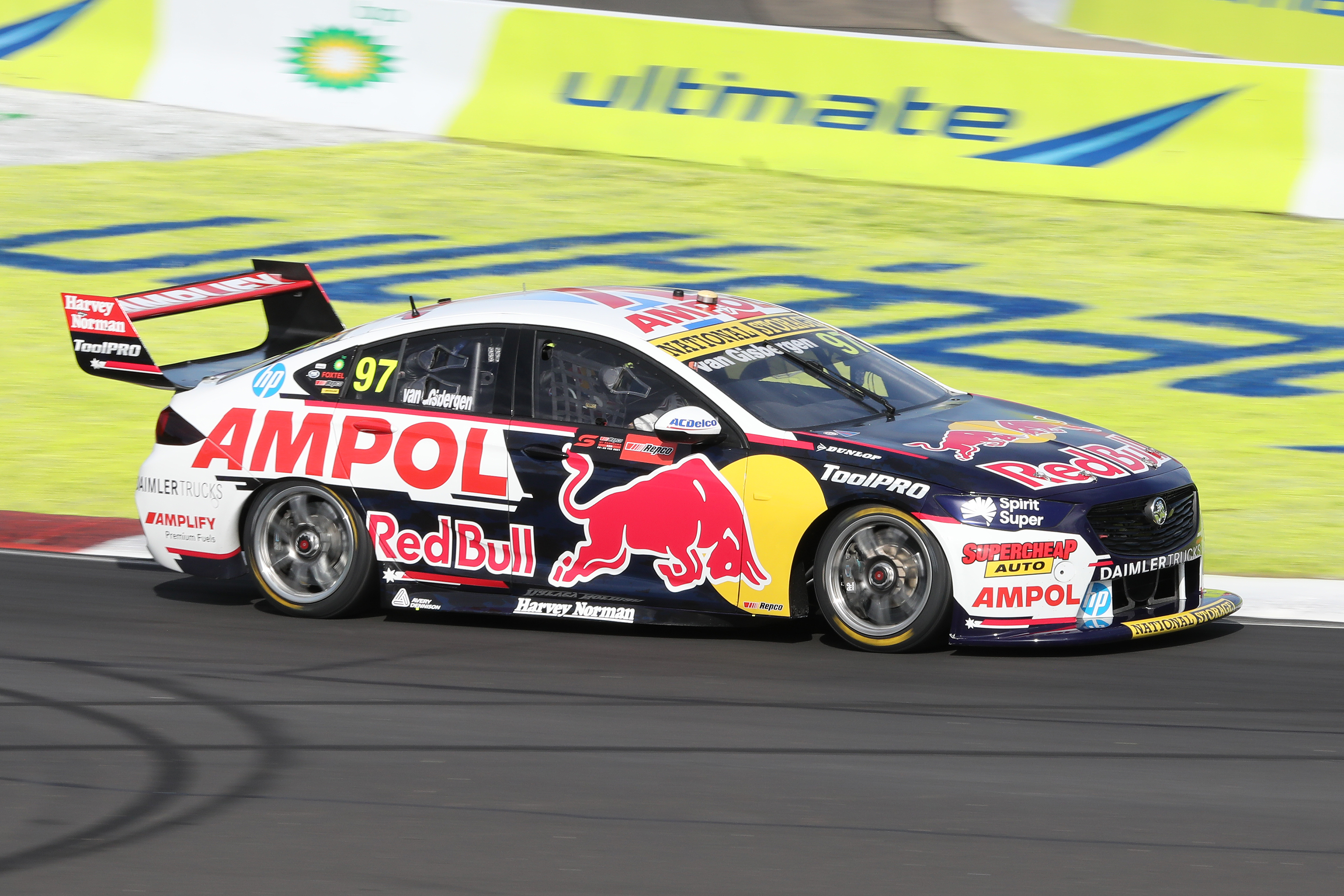
The Ampol-sponsored Holden Commodore ZB of Shane van Gisbergen in 2021.

In 1957 Ampol sponsored David Mackay (Australian Land Speed Record, 143.19 m.p.h.) and Mary Seed (Class E World Land Speed Record and Australian Women's Land Speed Record, 112.95 m.p.h.) at the Carrathool Speed Trials. From 1987 until 1993, Caltex was the title sponsor of Colin Bond Racing. From 2000 until 2007, it was title sponsor of Stone Brothers Racing with Russell Ingall winning the 2005 championship. In 2016 and 2017, Caltex was title sponsor of the Triple Eight Race Engineering car of Craig Lowndes, having previously been an associate sponsor of the team.

Under its new brand, in August 2020, Ampol continued its sponsorship relationship with the Red Bull Holden Racing for the Triple Eight Race Engineering, with the team updating its car livery and race suits to Ampol and its fuel brands. In 2021, Ampol replaced Holden as the team's Major Sponsor for Triple Eight alongside Red Bull, and the team was renamed Red Bull Ampol Racing.

=== Soccer ===
In March 2016, Caltex began a four-year contract as sponsor of the Australia national soccer team.

=== Australian rules football ===
In December 2023, it was announced that Ampol would be a platinum partner of the Carlton Football Club from the 2024 AFL season until at least 2026. The Ampol brand would be featured on the top back of Carlton's guernsey.

== See also ==
- List of automotive fuel retailers
- List of convenience stores
