= List of Woolworths Group companies =

Brands of supermaket retail Woolworths Group

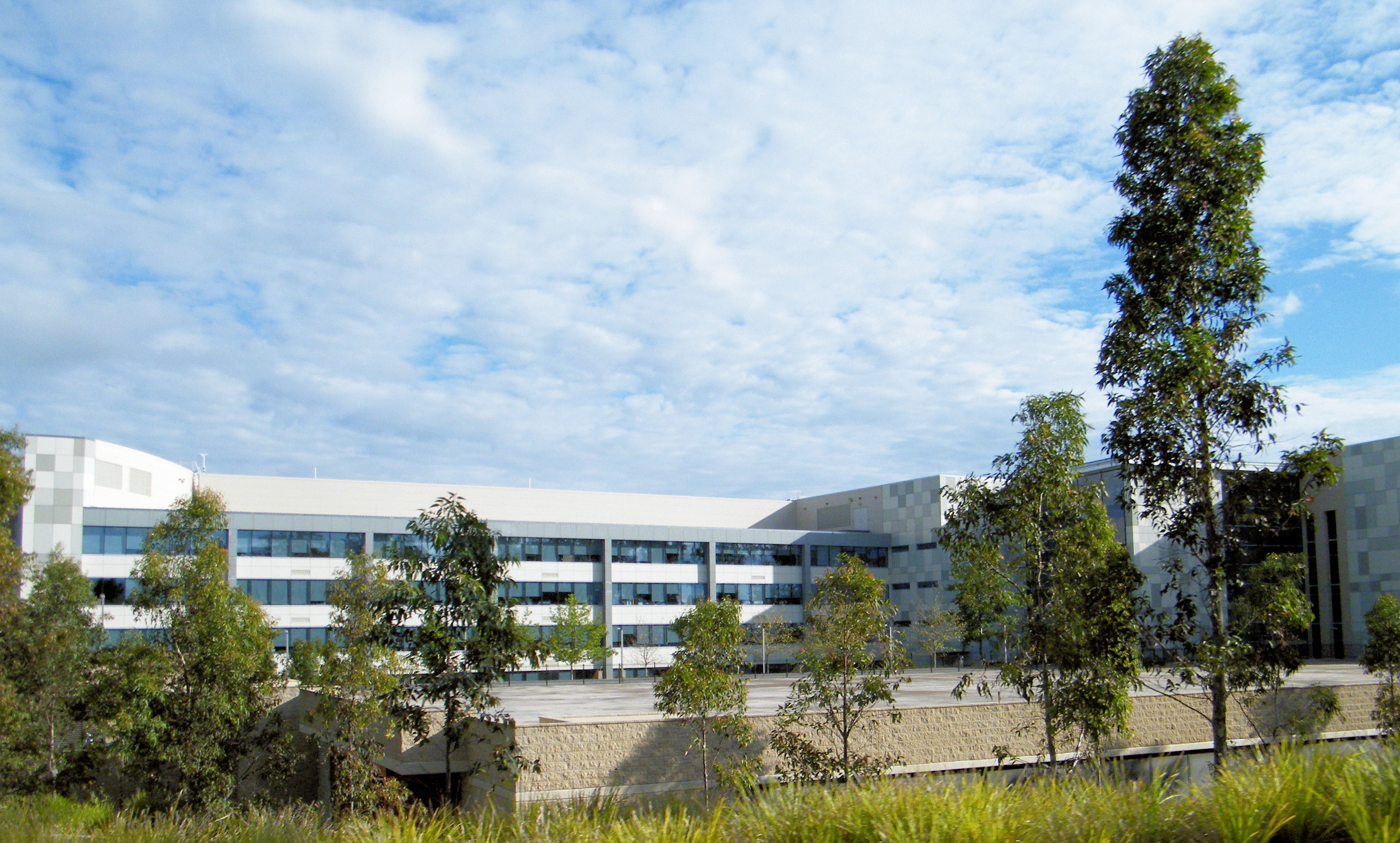
Woolworths Limited headquarters in the Norwest Business Park

This list of Woolworths Group companies is a compilation of the divisions, chains, and brands of Woolworths Group, a major Australian company with extensive retail interest throughout Australia and New Zealand. It is the second-largest company in Australia by revenue, after Perth-based retail-focused conglomerate Wesfarmers, and the largest food retailer in Australia, as well as the second largest in New Zealand.

The Woolworths Limited group is currently divided into three business divisions; Australian Food, New Zealand Food & Portfolio.

== Operating Segments ==
=== Australian Food ===
==== Woolworths Food Retail ====
Woolworths Food Retail includes Woolworths Supermarkets and Metro

- Woolworths – The company's premier supermarket chain, which operates in every Australian state and territory. The supermarkets are often colloquially known as "Woolies" and have used the slogan 'The Fresh Food People' since 1987.
- Woolworths Metro – Inner-urban small format supermarkets located in the key metropolitan areas selling a range of pre-prepared meals & fresh food for the 'time poor' customer.

==== WooliesX ====
WooliesX is Woolworths Digital & eCommerce division.

- eComX
  - Woolworths Online (B2C eCommerce) – An online supermarket allowing customers to order groceries and have them delivered to their front door. The groceries are packed in special warehouses and stores located around the country.
  - Woolworths at Work (B2B eCommerce) – An online shopping platform for business consumers that allows Australian workplaces to shop online for fresh food, kitchen and cleaning supplies, and other essential products launched in 2020.
  - Milkrun – Milkrun powered by Metro is the rebranding of Woolworths own similar Metro60 food delivery service after it acquired former start-up Milkrun in 2023.
  - HomeRun – HomeRun provides delivery across Woolworth's Australia and New Zealand businesses.
- Everyday Rewards & Services – Division offering the Everyday Rewards Loyalty program with customers fuel saving offers, and Money Off your shop. As of February 2010, there were 4.6 million Everyday Rewards cards registered, with 2.1 million linked with Qantas Frequent Flyer memberships, the scheme has since rebranded from Everyday Rewards and some former liquor businesses of Woolworths Limited no longer accept the scheme since 2021. EverydayX is their digital Everyday Rewards platform.
- Digital & Media
  - idX – Digital division featuring the ConnectedX platform that creates 'digital experience'.
  - Cartology – established in 2019 as Woolworths's retail media business. It includes former retail digital media company Shopper Media Group that was acquired in 2022.

=== Australian B2B ===
==== B2B Food ====
B2B Food is a segment targeting businesses, food service channels and wholesale markets with good food, good service and good value under Woolworths Food Company.

Woolworths Food Company
Woolworths Food Company, or Woolworths FoodCo, is the division responsible for developing new product categories, improving fresh meat supply and processing facilities, and developing strategic sourcing relationships with Woolworths’ primary industry partners. It produces the Woolworths 'Woolworths Own and Exclusive' Private label products.

- Australian Grocery Wholesalers (AGW) was established in October 2019 originally to supply Caltex (now Ampol) petrol stations and is now a national food wholesaler.
- PFD Food Services Pty Ltd (PFD) is a wholesale food distribution business that supplies and delivers an extensive range of fresh, frozen and dry goods to business customers across Australia. Woolworths took over PFD from the Smith family on 28 August 2024.

Woolworths Own and Exclusive brands:

- All Smiles
- Apollo
- Armada
- Azure
- Balnea
- Baxter
- Bell Farms
- Chevron
- Clean
- Confidere
- Eva May
- Farmer’s Own
- First Force
- Frankie & Friends
- Help at Hand
- Highgate
- Hillview
- House & Home
- Inspire
- La Gina
- Little Ones
- Little Wishes
- Lolly Go Round
- Macro Wholefoods Market
- Market Value
- Mint
- Oscar Orsen
- Paperclick
- Plantitude
- Plus Sum
- Prep Set Go
- Quantum
- Shine
- Smiling Tums
- Smitten
- Soften
- Strike
- Sushi Izu
- Thomas Dux
- Vevelle
- Voeu
- Woolworths Gold
- Your Majesty
- Zen Zone

==== B2B Supply Chain ====
- Primary Connect is a national distribution network, consisting of road, rail and ocean transport services and Third Party Logistics storage facilities that was established 2023 in Australia and 2019 in New Zealand. It sits within the Woolworths Supply Chain structure and works with the Woolworths Replenishment team and Woolworths Distribution Centres.
- Statewide Independent Wholesalers (SIW) is a joint venture between Woolworths and Tasmanian Independent Retailers operating in Tasmania.

=== New Zealand Food ===
- Woolworths – Woolworth NZ's flagship supermarket chain – 191 full-service discount supermarkets, operating across the North and South Islands of New Zealand.
- SuperValue – franchised convenience supermarket
- FreshChoice – franchised full-service supermarket
- Woolworths Home Shopping
- Milkrun – grocery deliveries

=== W Living ===
Non-food retail businesses, including discount general merchandise retailer and online businesses.

- Big W – Discount department store chain, which sell a wide range of general merchandise.
- Petstock – Australia's second largest specialty pet retailer offering a broad range of pet products and services in-store and online.
- Healthylife – digital startup providing a range of health services and advice, fitness and nutrition tracking, vitamins, sports nutrition, along with a specialised range of nutrition-based natural and organic products. The HealthyLife brand was associated with an existing Australian health retail business that closed in 2019 and was purchased by Woolworths in 2021.
- Woolworths MarketPlus (WMP)
  WMP platform provides the opportunity for third party sellers to sell products across Woolworths Group's various marketplace businesses.
  - Big W Market – Targeted at BIG W customers to shop for an extended range of products from WMP marketplace sellers alongside BIG W products.
  - Everyday Market – Everyday Market from Woolworths is an offering for Woolworths customers to shop an extended range of products and categories from thousands of WMP sellers which includes partnerships with Appliances Online and Koala Living whilst collecting Everyday Rewards points.

=== Others ===
==== WPay ====
WPay is a spin-off of Woolworths in-house payment processing capability into a standalone business offering a cloud-based payments-as-a-service platform to other Australian merchants.

==== Q-Retail ====
Joint venture between Woolworths group and Quantium that offers data science and advanced analytics services.

- wiq by Woolworths
- WiQ by Quantium

== Former chains and brands ==
=== Australia ===
- Woolworths Food Fair – The name given to the company's growing food-retailing interests in the 1960s to differentiate them from the variety-based stores. In NSW a number of the stores were rebranded to Flemings Foodstores, in Victoria a number of the stores were rebranded Nancarrows Foodstores, in Queensland the name was merged into the BCC Foodstores, In South Australia a number of the stores were rebranded as Fabulous Foodstores and in Western Australia the stores retained the name into the late 1980's prior to Woolworths selling off a larger percentage of their Foodstores.
- Woolworths Variety – The name given to the company's traditional variety stores to differentiate them from the company's food-retailing interests, when the decision was made to use the original Woolworths name for the company's food stores and supermarkets instead of its variety stores. These variety stores were progressively divested as Woolworths focused on food retailing and developed large-scale discount department stores.
- Woolworths Family Centre – Woolworths opened its first hypermarket at Booval near Ipswich, Queensland in November 1969 under the Big W name. A second hypermarket was opened in 1970 in Indooroopilly, Brisbane, under the Woolworths Family Centre name. The early popularity of these stores led to Woolworths establishing hypermarkets around Australia using the Woolworths Family Centre name. However the concept failed to perform, and the hypermarkets were re-established as separated Woolworths supermarkets and Big W discount department stores in the late 1970s to early 1980s.
- Woolworths Homemakers – Name given to company's homemaker stores that sold furniture, electrical appliances, TV's and Stereos, Whitegoods, outdoor furniture, floorcoverings and soft furnishings these stores had all closed by the mid 1980s
- Brisbane Cash & Carry (BCC) - Pioneering supermarket chain in Queensland bought by Woolworths in the 1950s but continued to trade under the BCC name well into the 1980s.
- Crazy Prices – A variety store chain that sold discounted merchandise. These stores were sold to (and formed part of) rival Go-Lo in 2001, although the last store with Crazy Prices branding didn't close until 2005 in Port Macquarie. Its slogan was "The Bargains are Better".
- Rockmans – Women's clothing retailer acquired by the group in 1960 and was a major operating division until its sale in 2000 to Consolidated Press Holdings.
- Woolworths Plus Petrol – The original name of the petrol sites owned by Woolworths before the joint venture with Caltex.
- Flemings – Group of four supermarkets located in Sydney and the Central Coast (the remnants of a chain purchased in the 1960s). All have since closed or rebranded to Woolworths or Woolworths Metro, with the last remaining Flemings located at Jannali closed in May 2020.
- Woolworths Liquor – Liquor department or really segregated shop of a Woolworths supermarket stores. They were not located in South Australia, Queensland and Tasmania, as State law there prohibited liquor sales at supermarkets and were formerly known as "Mac's Liquor". In 2012, 'Woolworths Liquor' were rebranded as BWS although some signage remained into late 2010's and online.
- Philip Leong – An Independent chain of three supermarkets that operated in the Townsville region of Northern Queensland. Philip Leong was bought out by Woolworths in April 1981 but continued to operate under Philip Leong branding until the early 2000s when the chain was rebranded as Woolworths.
- Roelf Vos and Purity supermarkets – Two Tasmanian supermarkets located in the north and south respectively. Bought out by Woolworths (Purity in 1981 and Roelf Vos in 1982) however they continued to trade under these names until being rebranded as Woolworths in 2000. The stores adopted the standard Woolworths look and feel of their mainland counterparts but with the 'Purity' or 'Roelf Vos' text in the logo in place of Woolworths.
- Peanuts – A short lived discount store operated in Tasmania. Woolworths answer to local discount store Chickenfeed.
- Dick Smith – Sold to Anchorage Capital Partners on 27 September 2012
- Dick Smith Powerhouse – Larger Dick Smith stores with a focus on consumer entertainment products. (Sold to Anchorage Capital Partners on 27 September 2012, as part of the Dick Smith chain of stores.)
- Tandy – Tandy brand is now phased out, and have become smaller Dick Smith stores.
- Masters Home Improvement – In 2009, Woolworths announced a joint venture with US home improvement retailer Lowe's to enter the home improvement market. Based on documents submitted to the government, Woolworths' hardware chain will be named Masters. This was confirmed on 2 May 2011. The first store was located in Braybrook, Victoria and opened in September 2011. As of June 2014, 49 Masters stores were operational in Australia. On 24 August 2016, Woolworths announced that all Masters stores would close on or before 11 December 2016.
- Safeway – In 1985 Woolworths Limited acquired Safeway and used it as the trading name for Woolworths supermarkets in Victoria. In August 2008, Woolworths announced it would be rebranding these stores as Woolworths. As of 2015, nearly all of the Safeway stores in Victoria have been rebranded as 'Woolworths'.
- Food For Less – Discount supermarket chain located in Queensland and New South Wales. All have closed or were rebranded to Woolworths.
- Adore Beauty – In 2015, Woolworths purchased a 25% stake in the online cosmetics retailer. In 2017, Adore Beauty founder Kate Morris bought back Woolworths' 25% stake.
- Thomas Dux – Upmarket supermarket / deli chain launched in 2008 and ceased trading in 2017.
- Macro Wholefoods – Organic food and produce chain purchased in May 2009. The eight stores were converted to Thomas Dux stores and Macro was launched as an organic and health food range.
- MyDeal – Online marketplace acquired in September 2022. It shut down in September 2025.
- PetCulture – Pet products, services and insurance online business established as a joint venture with PetSure in September 2020. Woolworths owned a 60 percent stake in the venture.

==== Endeavour Group ====
The Endeavour Group was a joint venture with the Bruce Mathieson Group containing a range of liquor & hospitality assets. Woolworths Group held a 85% stake in the Endeavour Group. In June 2021, the Endeavour Group was listed as a separate entity on the Australian Stock Exchange.

- BWS – Liquor stores mostly co-located with the company's supermarkets.
- Cellarmasters – Online wine business; Woolworths Limited bought the company in 2011.
- Dan Murphy's – Large liquor barns often referred to as Liquor Supermarkets.
- Langton's – Wine auctioneers and retailers
- Australian Leisure and Hospitality Group – Hotel and poker machine operator. Involvement in the poker machine industry, and has led to extensive ongoing boycott campaigns by GetUp!! and others.

=== New Zealand ===
- Dick Smith Electronics – sell a wide range of hobby electronic products and consumer goods such as computer products. (Now owned by Anchorage Capital Partners as part of the Dick Smith chain of stores.)
- Dick Smith Powerhouse – Large stores with a focus on consumer entertainment products. (Also included in sale to Anchorage Capital Partners)
- Foodtown – 20 full-service supermarkets, operating in Auckland, Hamilton, and Tauranga – all stores rebranding to Countdown by late 2012.
- Woolworths @ Gull – 22 Woolworths Quickstop and Woolworths Micro convenience supermarkets, operating in the North Island on Gull Petroleum fuel sites. All stores have later been purchased by Night 'n Day Foodstores Limited to become Night 'n Day@Gull stores.
- Countdown

=== India ===
- Croma/Tata Group Venture – In 2006 Woolworths and the Tata Group of India announced an electronics retailing venture on the subcontinent. The stores were based on the Dick Smith Powerhouse format.
