= Jayne Hrdlicka =

American-Australian airline executive

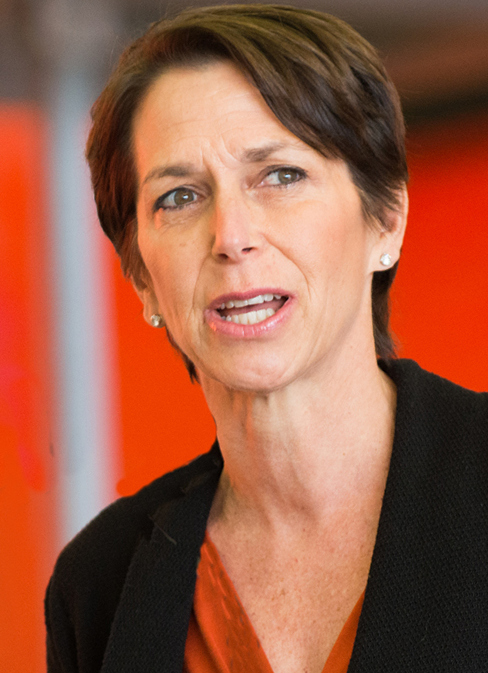
- Hrdlicka in 2014
- Born: 1961 or 1962 (age 64–65); Wichita, Kansas, United States
- Education: Colorado College (BA); Dartmouth College (MBA)
- Occupation: Businesswoman
- Organization: Endeavour Group

Carla Jayne Hrdlicka (born 1961 or 1962) is an American-Australian business executive based in Australia. She is currently CEO and managing director of Endeavour Group, commencing in the role in January 2026.

Hrdlicka has led several Australian and New Zealand companies as CEO, including Jetstar Airways, The a2 Milk Company and most recently, Virgin Australia. Hrdlicka was also previously chairman and Board President of Tennis Australia from 2017–2025.

== Early life and education ==
Hrdlicka was born in Wichita, Kansas, in the United States. Her father Richard Hrdlicka is from Czechoslovakia and worked as a lawyer, eventually becoming the general counsel of automotive manufacturer Fiat in North America; he was also director of a community bank in Newton, Kansas. Her father had defected from Czechoslovakia while he was in Paris competing as a member of a national hockey team in 1948 at the age of sixteen. After his defection he wrote letters to American teenagers that he had met the previous year as a Scout while attending the World Scout Jamboree in France; the American teenagers raised the funds necessary for him to migrate to the US. Her mother Carol Hrdlicka (née Knott) was from a Kansas ranching family. She has a younger brother named David.

Hrdlicka attended Newton High School in Newton, Kansas; during her high school years she became the Kansas state champion in the sport of tennis. She went on to college in Colorado after high school, graduating from Colorado College in Colorado Springs with a Bachelor of Arts degree in mathematics and economics. She also holds an MBA from Tuck School of Business at Dartmouth College in New Hampshire.

== Career ==
Between 1987 and 1991 then again from 1997 until 2010, Hrdlicka held senior positions at Bain & Company, initially in the United States, then in Australia, after she emigrated to that country from the US in 1994 to take charge of a company producing sports trading cards in Sydney. She also held a senior position at Arthur Young & Company.

From 2010 to 2012 Hrdlicka was a senior executive at Australian airline Qantas. In July 2012, Hrdlicka was appointed group chief executive officer at Qantas subsidiary Jetstar, a position she held until November 2017, when she was appointed the CEO of Qantas Loyalty and Digital Ventures, the company within Qantas responsible for the airline's frequent-flyer program. She left Qantas in April 2018 and in July 2018 she became managing director, chief executive officer and director of The a2 Milk Company, a dairy company based in Auckland, New Zealand.

Her resignation from a2 Milk in December 2019 was the subject of speculation that the pace of change Hrdlicka drove was too fast or that the Board was dissatisfied with the scale of payments to the consulting firm, Bain & Company. a2 shares rose 40% during her 18-month tenure. Hrdlicka later stated she left a2 because her husband was found in November 2019 to have a kidney tumour, from which he eventually died in May 2023.

Hrdlicka was a director of Tennis Australia between January 2016 and October 2017 and was appointed Board President and Chair of Tennis Australia in October 2017, remaining in the role until 2025. She also served as a director at Woolworths from 2010 to 2016. She is a member of Tuck School of Business' Asian Advisory Board.

On 18 November 2020, Hrdlicka became the CEO of Virgin Australia Holdings (parent company of Virgin Australia, Qantas and Jetstar's main competitor) when Bain Capital took ownership of the airline, following the resignation of Paul Scurrah and the company's exit from administration. Hrdlicka announced her resignation as Virgin Australia's CEO in February 2024, and in March 2025, it was announced that current Chief Commercial Officer Dave Emerson would replace her in the role.

Following Hrdlicka's departure from Virgin Australia, it was announced that she had been appointed CEO of Endeavour Group, parent company of Dan Murphy's and BWS liquor stores. Hrdlicka commenced in the role in January 2026.

== Personal life ==
Hrdlicka was married to Jason Gaudin, an Australian who formerly worked as Head of Corporate & Investment Banking Australia & New Zealand at Wells Fargo Bank and who died from cancer in May, 2023. They have two sons: Alec (born 2004) and Josh (born 2007). Both sons have attended the Rafa Nadal Academy in Majorca.

The family's permanent residence is in Brisbane, where Virgin Australia is headquartered. Hrdlicka's previous home in the Melbourne suburbs was listed for sale in June 2022, with a sale price estimate of $18 million to $19 million.
