= South African Australians =

Ethnic group

Suid-Afrikaanse Australiërs
- (South Africa) (Australia)
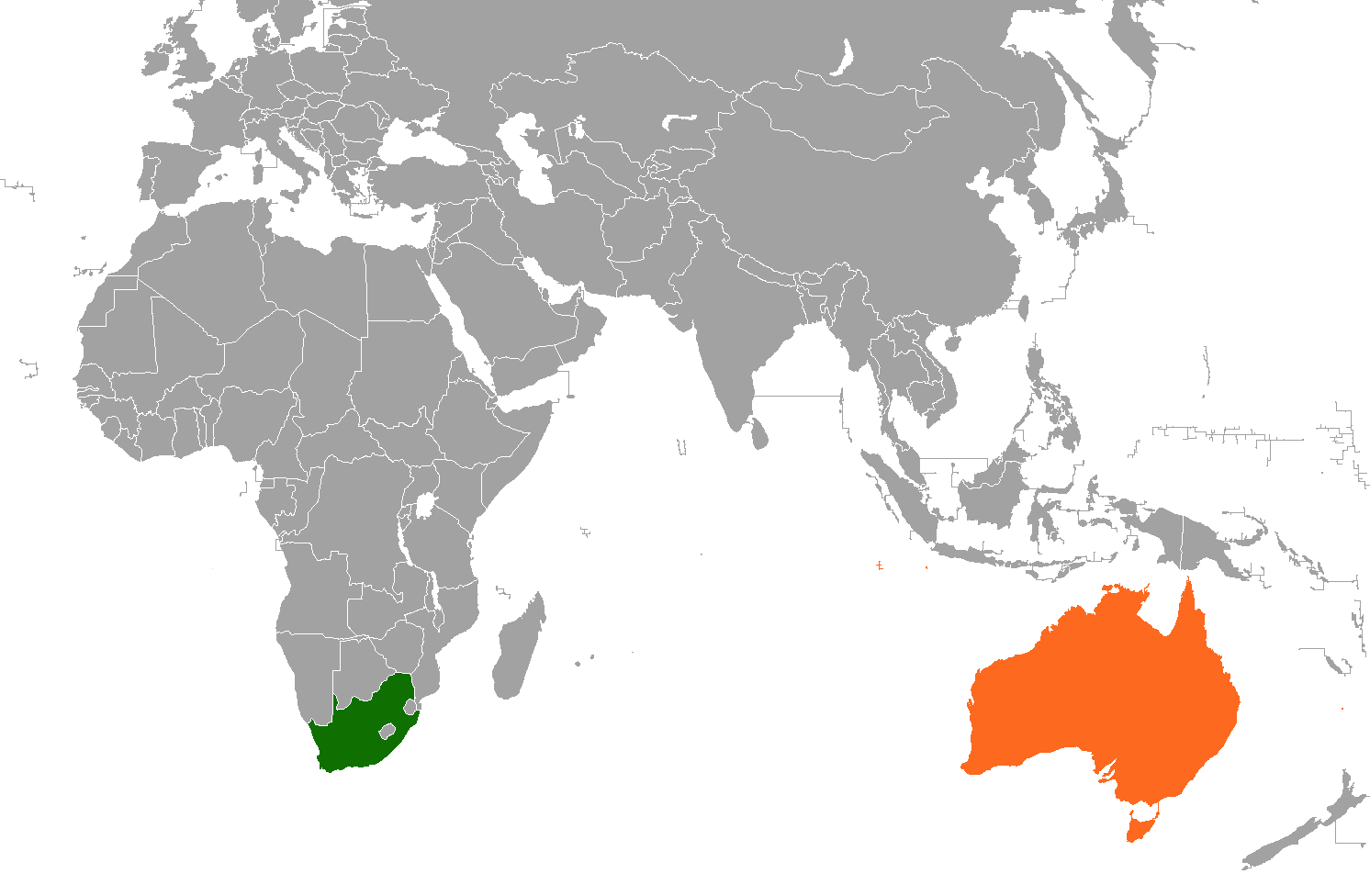
- South Africa (green) and Australia (orange)

Total population
- 144,666 (by ancestry, 2021 census) (0.6% of the Australian population); 230,000 (by birth, 2025)

Regions with significant populations
- New South Wales: 39,548
- Queensland: 35,226
- Western Australia: 33,310
- Victoria: 26,082
- South Australia: 6,288

Languages
- South African English, Australian English, Afrikaans and other South African languages

Religion
- Majority: Reformed Christianity; Minority: Anglicanism, other Protestantism, Catholicism, Judaism, Hinduism

Related ethnic groups
- Afrikaners; Dutch Australians; South African New Zealanders; White South Africans; Zulu people

South African born population in Australia
Year	Pop.	±% p.a.
1996	61,810	—
2001	86,820	+7.03%
2006	119,490	+6.60%
2011	161,590	+6.22%
2016	180,480	+2.24%
2020	200,240	+2.63%
2025	229,950	+2.81%
Source: Australian Bureau of Statistics

South African Australians (Afrikaans: Suid-Afrikaanse Australiërs) are citizens or residents of Australia who are of South African descent.

According to the 2021 Australian census, 189,207 Australian residents were born in South Africa, making up 0.7% of the country's population. In addition, 144,666 people born in Australia claim South African ancestry, making up 0.6% of the total population. A strong majority of South African Australians are Australian citizens, with 76% possessing Australian citizenship. In the same 2021 census, 144,666 Australian residents claimed "South African" ancestry while another 6,153 stated their ancestry as "Afrikaner" and 501 as "Zulu".

People with South African ancestry as a percentage of the population in Sydney divided geographically by postal area, 2011

Immigration from South Africa to Australia consists overwhelmingly of people with white ancestry (including many Jews), particularly professionals, and had accelerated during the 1990s following the end of apartheid. More than half of all South African Australians arrived after the 1994 general election, which saw the victory of Nelson Mandela's African National Congress (ANC). A behaviour stigmatised by white South Africans who remained in their homeland as "Packing for Perth" ("PFP") was also a humorous dig and reference to supporters of the Progressive Federal Party – a political party formed in 1977 that drew support mainly from liberal English-speaking whites. As per 2021 census, 60% of Australians who are born in South Africa, claimed English, Dutch, German and Scottish ancestry, while only 40% claimed "South African" as an ancestry.

The number of permanent settlers arriving in Australia from South Africa since 1991 (monthly)

== Demographics ==
In the 2021 census, 189,207 people reported being born in South Africa, while 144,666 reported having South African ancestry. The number of South African-born Australians had grown to 224,160 by June 2024.

=== Languages ===
Among South African-born Australians, English was the most common language spoken at home, with 139,215 speakers (73.6% of the South African-born population), while Afrikaans was second with 42,893 (22.7%). The next most common languages spoken at home were German with 656 (0.3%), Portuguese with 480 (0.3%), Greek with 479 (0.3%), all ahead of Zulu (South Africa's most-spoken language) with 290 (0.2%). Of people with South African ancestry, 113,777 (78.6%) reported speaking English at home while 27,315 (18.8%) reported speaking Afrikaans at home.

Lameroo Regional Community School (LRSC), located in the rural town of Lameroo in the Murray Mallee region of South Australia, has taught Afrikaans as a second language for primary school students since 2024, being the only school in the country to do so. The language is taught due to the town's growing South African community working in the agricultural sector.

== Notable people ==
- Joany Badenhorst (Paralympic snowboarder)
- Brad Banducci (CEO of Woolworths Group)
- Christopher Bertke (electronic musician)
- Jamie Bloem (rugby player and referee)
- Johan Botha (South African test cricketer and coach)
- Wendy Botha (pro surfer)
- Robin Bell (athlete)
- Scherri-Lee Biggs (Miss Universe Australia 2011)
- Lauren Brant (former Hi-5 member)
- Kearyn Baccus (soccer player)
- Elsa Chauvel (filmmaker)
- J. M. Coetzee (writer, 2003 Nobel Prize in Literature laureate)
- Bryce Courtenay (writer)
- Michelle Cowan (AFL / AFLW Coach)
- Collette Dinnigan (fashion designer)
- Allan du Toit (Australian military representative to NATO)
- Anton Enus (SBS newsreader)
- Justin Erasmus (baseball player)
- Damian Cupido (Australian rules football player)
- Dane Haylett-Petty (rugby union football player)
- Dean Geyer (singer, and actor)
- David Gonski (chair, Australian Stock Exchange)
- Frances Hargreaves (actress)
- Cariba Heine (actress)
- Robert Holmes à Court (1937-1990) (businessman, Australia's richest person)
- Jason Johannisen (Australian Rules football player)
- Craig Johnston (soccer player)
- Dena Kaplan (actress)
- Cecil Kellaway (actor)
- Gail Kelly (CEO, Westpac)
- Marius Kloppers (CEO, BHP)
- Marnus Labuschagne (Australian Test cricketer)
- Jordan van den Lamb, (Socialist politician)
- Ryan Louwrens (rugby union football paper)
- Jessica Marais (actress)
- Sisonke Msimang (writer)
- Lovemore N'dou (boxer)
- Kerr Neilson (fund manager)
- Paul O'Brien (actor)
- Clyde Rathbone (rugby player)
- Craig Reucassel (comedian)
- Annalise Rasmussen (soccer player), of South African descent
- Selwyn (R&B singer)
- Troye Sivan (actor and singer-songwriter)
- Tammin Sursok (actress)
- Giam Swiegers (businessman)
- Stephan van der Walt (rugby union football player)
- Jean van der Westhuyzen (Olympic sprint canoeist)
- Dan Vickerman (rugby player)
- Margaret Wild (writer)
- Nathaniel Willemse (singer)
- Young Pluto (boxer)
- Rob Swire (DJ, electronic music producer, musician, singer)

== See also ==
- African Australians
- Australia–South Africa relations
- South African diaspora
