= Endeavor Group Holdings =

Endeavor Group Holdings may refer to:

- Endeavor (company), media company in the United States
- Endeavour Group, alcohol retailer in Australia
