= Victory Hotel =

Hotel in Brisbane, Queensland

The Victory Hotel
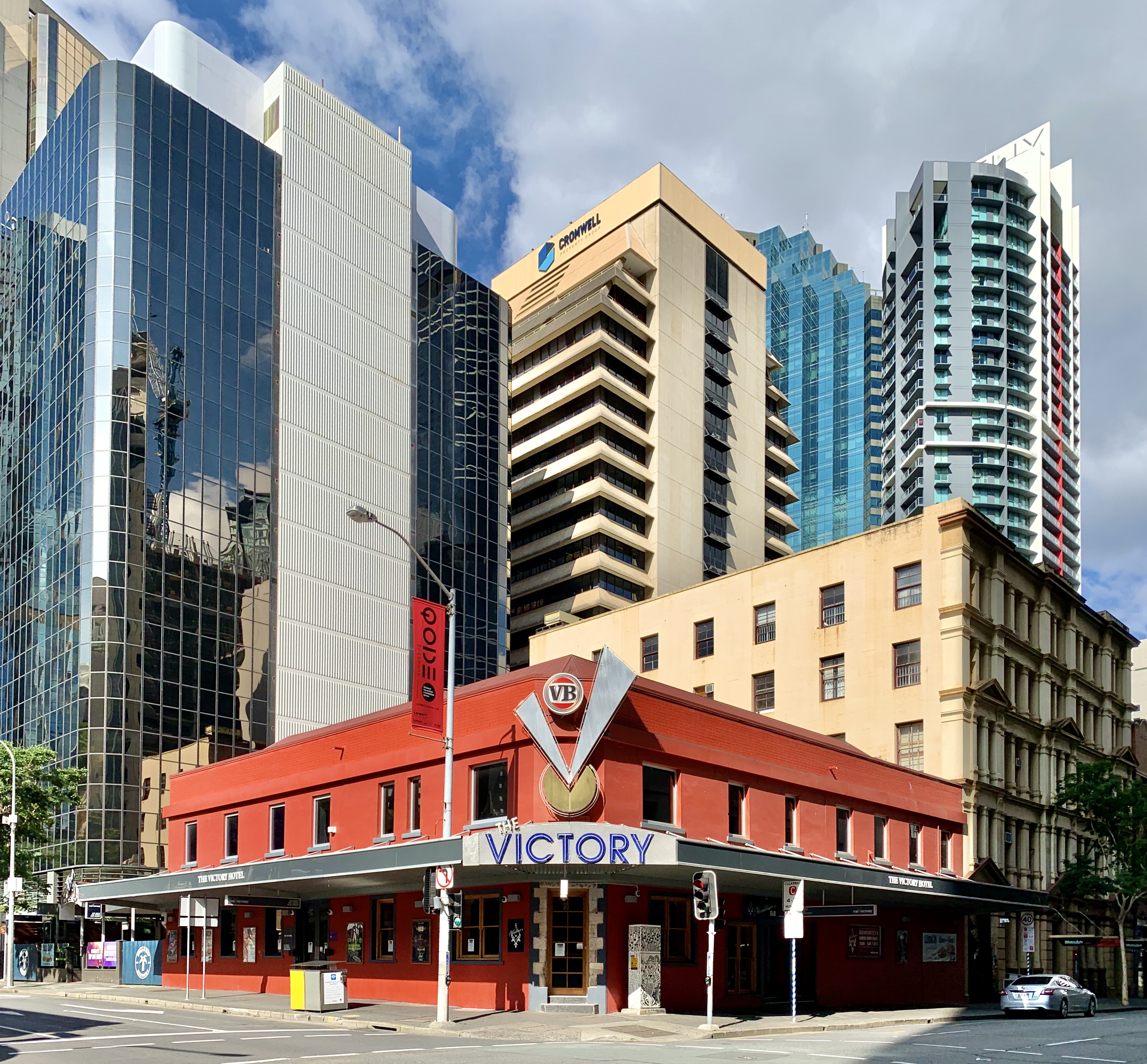
- Victory Hotel, 2020
- Interactive map of the The Victory Hotel area

General information
- Type: Hotel
- Location: 127 Edward Street, Brisbane central business district
- Coordinates: 27°28′12″S 153°01′43″E
- Owner: Precision Group

Technical details
- Floor area: 924 m2

Website
- www.thevictory.com.au

The Victory Hotel is a historic pub located on the corner of Edward and Charlotte Streets in the Brisbane central business district, Queensland, Australia. It was listed on the Brisbane Heritage Register in 2009.

The hotel site totals 924 square metres and consists of two levels, incorporating six bars throughout the venue, lounge, deck, pool room, beer garden and gaming room.

== History ==
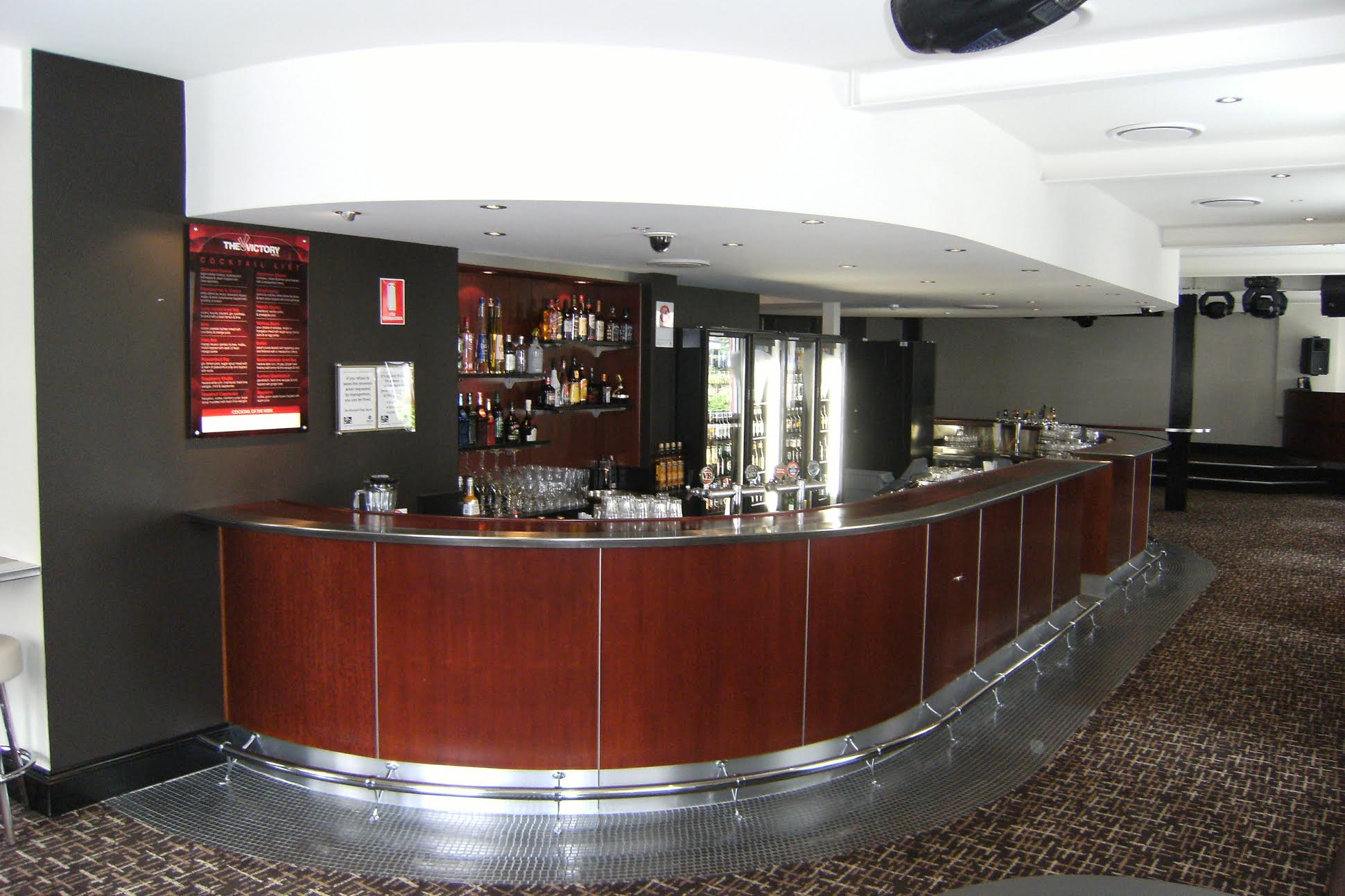
Victory Hotel's upstairs bar

The Victory Hotel was built in 1855. It is the oldest surviving hotel in Brisbane's CBD. The hotel was previously known as the Prince of Wales Hotel and has been altered since that time, including the removal of its verandahs, but retains the main characteristics of a nineteenth century hotel, such as its prominent corner location.

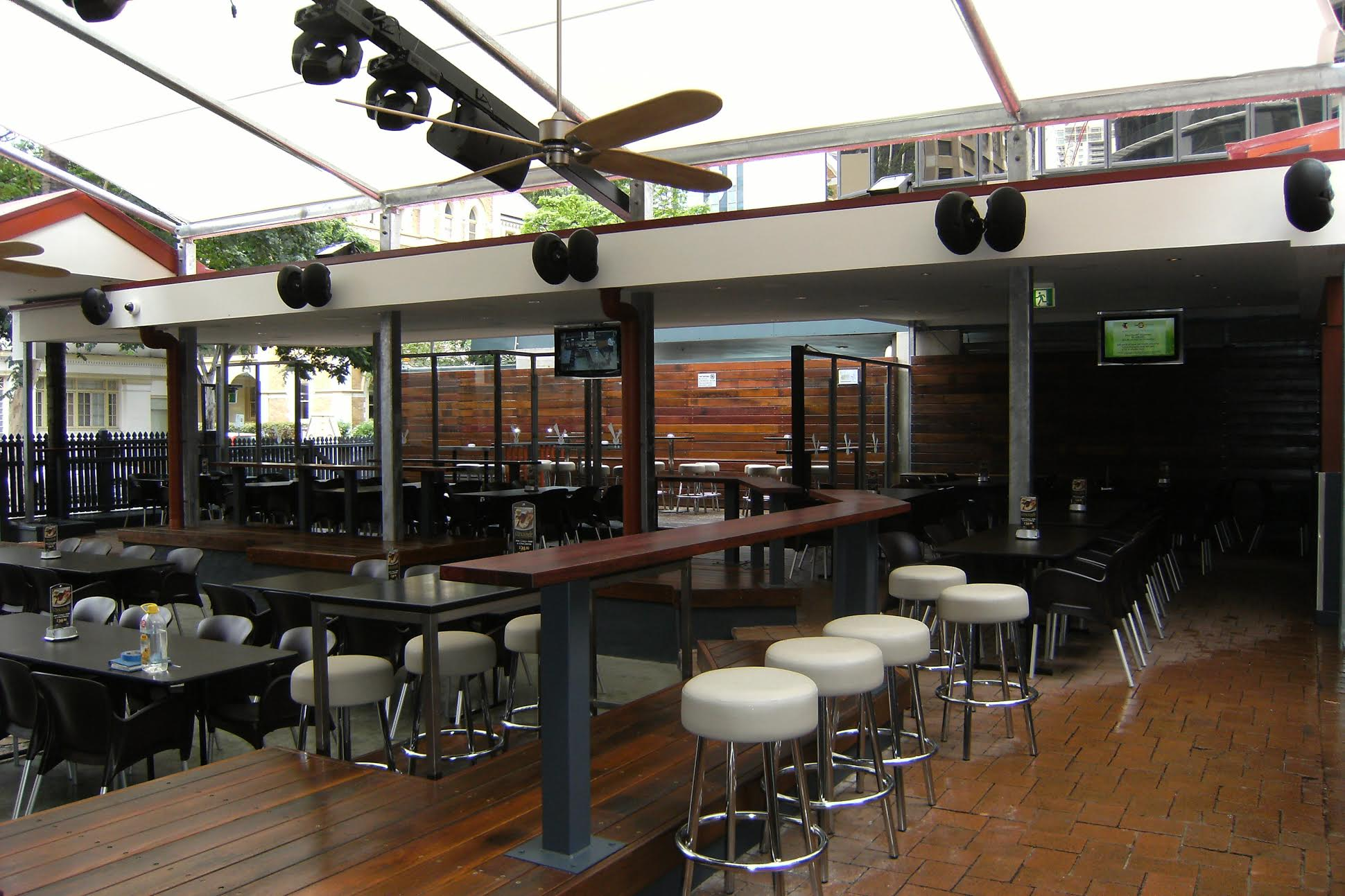
Beer garden

The hotel was operated on a 20-year lease by Australian Leisure and Hospitality Group (ALH) from 2003 to 2023.

On 27 July 2008, the hotel was extensively damaged by fire, but was rebuilt to be close to its original form and opened again on 9 March 2009.

The hotel was acquired by Precision Group for $22 million in 2005 from VH Partnership.

In February 2023, the lessees ALH announced that they would cease trading at the hotel on Sunday 19 February 2023 as they would not be renewing their 20-year lease. Precision Group expect the hotel will re-open in March 2023 with a new operator.
