= Action (supermarkets) =

Former Australian supermarket chain

Action Supermarkets
- Action logo

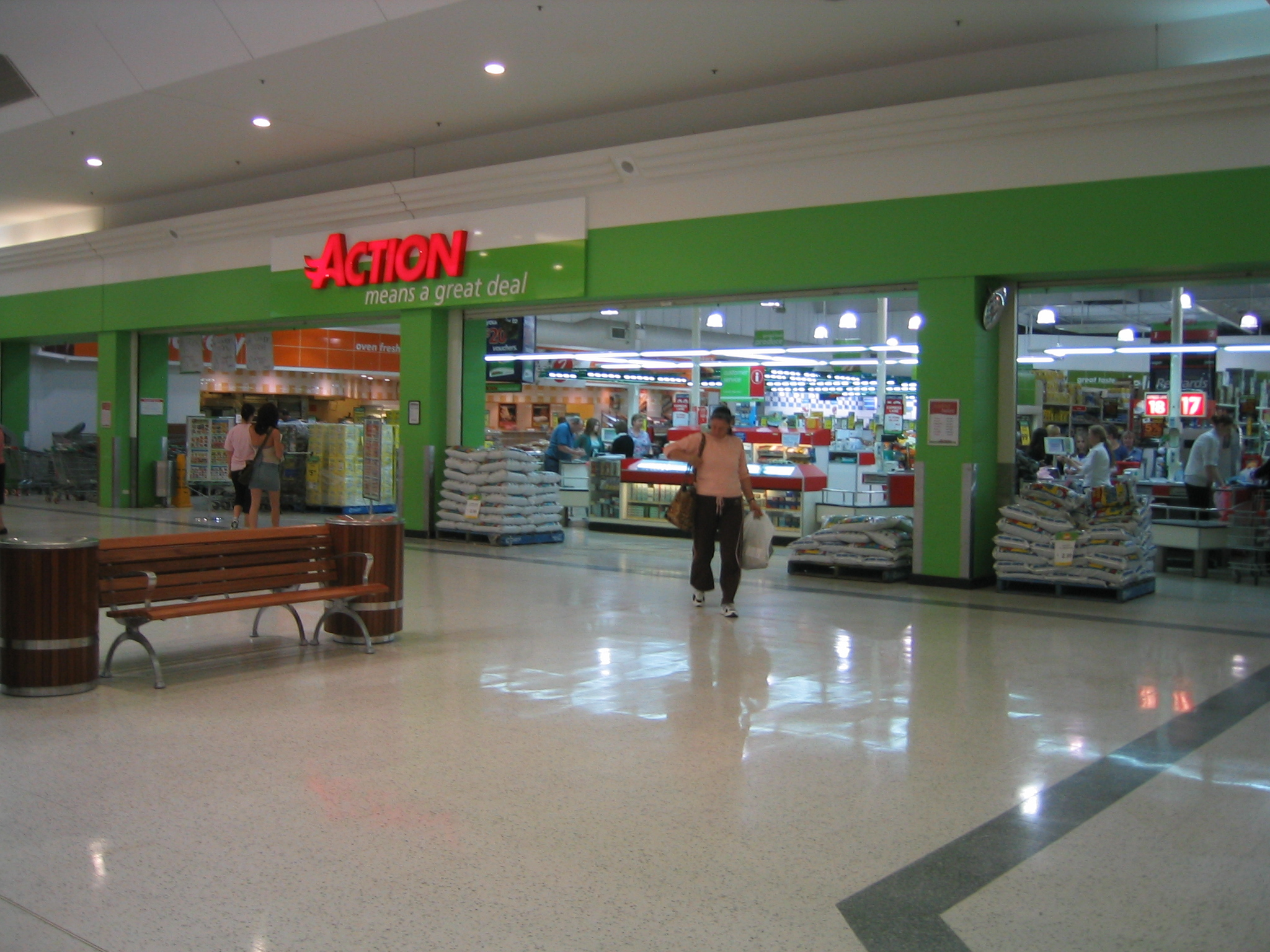
- A former Action Supermarket in Westfield Whitford City, 2006
- Type: Subsidiary
- Industry: Retail
- Founded: 1970; 56 years ago
- Defunct: 2007; 19 years ago
- Fate: Sold to Metcash
- Headquarters: Canning Vale, Western Australia
- Number of locations: 80 stores (2007)
- Key people: Rod McPhee
- Products: Groceries and general products
- Parent: Metcash

Action (formerly Action Food Barns and Action Supermarkets) was an Australian supermarket chain. Based in Perth, Action had 80 supermarkets across Western Australia, Queensland and New South Wales, and was one of the largest supermarket chains in Australia.

== History ==
Action's first supermarkets were located in Dianella, Dogswamp (Yokine), Morley, Woodlands and Osborne Park. Action's head office was located at 218 Bannister Road in Canning Vale, Action's Fresh Produce Centre was located in Osborne Park and Meat Centre in Malaga.

Action was originally operated exclusively in Western Australia by Foodland Associated Limited (FAL), which was New Zealand's largest supermarket company and also operated the Supa Valu, Dewsons and Dewsons Express supermarkets in WA.

In 2001, Action had expanded into Queensland and northern NSW by purchasing 40 Franklins stores and associated distribution centres.

FAL was later sold to rivals Metcash (Australian licensee of the international IGA brand) and Woolworths in late 2005.

In March 2006, Metcash announced that it would convert its remaining Action-branded supermarkets into IGA-branded stores. By October 2007, the last of the stores had been converted or sold.

Action's last slogan was "Action means a great deal". Previous slogans included "Packed Full of Great Shopping Ideas" and "Packed Full of Good Taste".

Action served in excess of 750,000 customers every week and employed over 7,800 staff. Total supermarket trading area at the end of the November 2003 was approximately 159,000 square metres.

== Private label brands ==
Action's generic brand range was called "Basics" and its corporate generic brand range was the "Signature Range".
