= Masters Home Improvement =

Former Australian hardware retailer

- Type: Subsidiary
- Industry: Retail, Home improvement
- Founded: 1 September 2011
- Defunct: 11 December 2016
- Number of locations: 63
- Area served: Australia, New Zealand
- Key people: Grant O'Brien (Woolworths CEO); Matt Tyson (Director, Home Improvement); Melinda Smith (Director, Masters)
- Revenue: A$903 million (2017)
- Operating income: A$59 million (2017)
- Parent: Woolworths; Lowe's
- Website: www.masters.com.au

Masters Home Improvement was an Australian home improvement chain operated by two retailers; Woolworths and Lowe's. It was established as a way for Woolworths to enter the hardware retail market, which has been historically dominated by Bunnings, owned by their competitor Wesfarmers. These two companies also compete with each other with groceries, liquor, fuel and general merchandise. Most of the stores shared the same format of conventional Lowe's stores and borrowed elements from Bunnings Warehouse for the garden and trade areas.

The joint venture was ultimately a failure for Woolworths, accumulating losses of over $3.2 billion over a seven year period, and caused Woolworths to leave the hardware market. All stores were closed and sold off by 11 December 2016. A key reason for the failure was the lack of product localisation to the Australian market from company leadership, with product schedules based upon the United States Northern Hemisphere seasons, which do not align with Australia's opposite Southern Hemisphere seasons. The failure is regarded as one of the biggest disasters in Australian retail history and left Bunnings with a near-monopoly over the retail hardware market in Australia.

== History ==
Woolworths announced a plan to enter the Australian hardware market by establishing a joint venture with United States–based hardware chain Lowe's on 25 August 2009. The plan was to develop 150 stores within a 5-year period.

The Masters brand name was announced on 3 May 2011, coinciding with the launch of the official website at masters.com.au. Hans Hulsbosch, who has already designed brand identities for Woolworths and Qantas, designed the Masters brand and logo. At that time, there were 14 stores under construction, with building approval for an additional 10.

The first outlet, in Braybrook, opened on 31 August 2011. Masters differentiated themselves from their competitors by having stores be brightly lit and colourful by using polished concrete, large colour signage, and store display. They also intended to place an emphasis on attracting female shoppers. Buzzers were scattered around the store, which, when pressed, will send a nearby staff member to that location to help out a customer. While a customer's paint was being tinted, pagers were handed to customers, enabling them to continue shopping. Masters also sold more 'non-hardware' lines such as whitegoods as well as having McDonald's restaurants with McCafés in selected stores. The first stores to open in each state were in Queensland on 11 October 2011, New South Wales on 4 December 2011, Western Australia, and South Australia in August 2012. It became clear during 2013 that the company was struggling. Leadership changes and product-line adjustments did little to keep the company afloat, and in August 2014 the store roll-out plan was revised.

The final store to open was in Penrith in December 2015.

In January 2016, Woolworths announced that it intended to "either sell or wind up" Masters Home Improvement. Chairman Gordon Cairns said that it would take years for Masters to become profitable, and that the ongoing losses cannot be sustained. To facilitate the sale or wind-up, Woolworths would buy back a one-third interest in the joint venture held by the Lowe's subsidiary WDR Delaware Corporation.

Following an eight month review process in which offers for the business were considered, it was officially announced on 24 August 2016 that all Masters stores would cease trading either on or before 11 December 2016; GA Australia was appointed to manage the sale of inventory, providing an underwritten recovery to deliver gross proceeds of approximately $500 million. Home Consortium, a private joint venture between Aurrum Group, Spotlight Group and Chemist Warehouse, planned to acquire the Masters property portfolio, including 40 freehold trading sites, 21 freehold development sites and 21 leasehold sites. A number of the sites were to be converted into Bunnings stores, with the remaining sites to be reformatted into multi-tenant format centres. Woolworths acquired three freehold sites and took assignment of 12 leases.

After a three month fire sale period, all the stores were shut down on 11 December 2016.

== Locations ==
At the time of closure there were a total of 63 stores in operation across all mainland states plus the Australian Capital Territory. There were no stores in Tasmania or the Northern Territory. Store locations were:

ACT: Canberra Airport

NSW: Albion Park, Bathurst, Chullora, Coffs Harbour, Gregory Hills, Heatherbrae, Hoxton Park, Lismore, Marsden Park, Northmead, Penrith, Rouse Hill, Rutherford, St Marys, Taree, Wagga Wagga and West Gosford

Qld: Bundall, Bundamba, Cairns, Everton Park, Mackay, Morayfield, Nerang, North Lakes, Parkinson, Richlands, Robina, Rockhampton, Springfield, Tingalpa, Toowoomba and Upper Coomera

SA: Adelaide Airport and Mount Gambier

Vic: Ballarat, Box Hill, Braybrook, Burnside, Carrum Downs, Cranbourne, Dandenong, Hawthorn East, Keysborough, Knoxfield, Mornington, Northland, Oakleigh South, Pakenham, Roxburgh Park, South Morang, Sunbury and Williams Landing

WA: Baldivis, Bayswater, Brighton, Bibra Lake, Ellenbrook, Forrestdale, Joondalup, Landsdale and Mandurah

There were an additional 21 development sites across Australia where a Masters store was planned for opening. This included sites at Bennetts Green (NSW), Chirnside Park (Vic), Fairy Meadow (NSW), Kirrawee (NSW), Maroochydore (Qld), Nowra (NSW), Noarlunga (SA) and Parafield (SA), where stores were already under construction.
