= Brad Banducci =

Australian executive and businessperson

- Born: Bradford Banducci
- Education: University of KwaZulu-Natal; Australian Graduate School of Management
- Occupation: Businessperson
- Known for: Managing director and CEO of Woolworths Group

Bradford Banducci is an Australian businessman. He has attained degrees from the University of KwaZulu-Natal in South Africa and the Australian Graduate School of Management in Sydney. He held roles at the Boston Consulting Group, Tyro Payments and Cellarmasters before joining the Woolworths Group in 2011. Banducci was Managing Director and CEO of the Woolworths Group from 2016 to 2024.

== Early life and education ==
Brad Banducci grew up in Boksburg, South Africa, where he worked with his father on selling sewing machines. His success in this endeavour as a teenager resulted in him being named the top sewing machine salesman for three years in a row starting from age 16. At the same time, he went to school at Christian Brothers College (CBC). He then studied at the University of KwaZulu-Natal where he completed a Bachelor of Commerce and a Bachelor of Law Degree. He moved to Australia in 1988, where he attended the Australian Graduate School of Management (AGSM), getting his Masters of Business Administration, Economics, Finance and Corporate Strategy and graduating in 1991.

== Career ==
After receiving his MBA, Banducci worked for the Boston Consulting Group for 14 years serving as the Vice President and Director of the company, servicing clients in Australia, New Zealand and Asia Pacific regions. He then served as the CFO and Director of Tyro Payments before he became the CEO of the Cellarmasters Group in 2007. Banducci joined the Woolworths Group in 2011 when they acquired Cellarmasters. In 2012, Banducci was made Director of the Woolworths Drinks business and then was made Managing Director of the Woolworths Food Group in March 2015. In February 2016, Banducci became the managing director CEO of the Woolworths Group.

Banducci retired from the Woolworths Group in September 2024. The announcement of his intention to retire occurred days after Banducci made national headlines for walking out of an interview with the ABC's Four Corners as part of their investigation into price gouging by major supermarkets in Australia. During a Senate committee hearing on supermarket practices, Banducci was questioned about the company's financial performance and he stated that return on equity (ROE) was not the right measure of the company's performance but rather return on capital employed (ROCE). Australian Greens Senator Nick McKim responded by threatening to hold Banducci in contempt.

Banducci became CEO of Ticketek owner TEG in March 2025. He left the company at the end of May 2026.
