= Milkrun =

Australian grocery delivery company

MILKRUN
- Industry: Grocery delivery
- Founded: 2021; 5 years ago in Australia 2023; 3 years ago in New Zealand
- Headquarters: Sydney
- Area served: Australia; New Zealand
- Owner: Woolworths Group
- Website: milkrun.com

Milkrun (stylised in capitals) is a grocery delivery company operating in Australia and New Zealand. It was founded in Sydney in 2021, and has been owned by Woolworths Group since 2023.

== History ==
Milkrun was founded by Dany Milham. After raising $11 million in June 2021, Milkrun launched in September 2021 in Sydney. It received $75 million in a series A round by Tiger Global in early 2022. Later in 2022 it attempted raising more capital but failed. Originally only available in Sydney, coverage soon expanded to Melbourne. Milkrun originally promised 10 minute deliveries, but they had to remove the promise in June 2022 to reduce costs, as it was running at a loss on every order. That month they started delivering alcohol with the hope that it would improve Milkrun's losses.

In February 2023 Milkrun started laying off 20% of its staff due to financial difficulties. In April, just 18 months after it initially launched, Milkrun closed, citing worsening economic conditions. It had more than 400 employees, and the company was able to pay them as well as Milkrun's suppliers. Milkrun's competitors were also having financial difficulties and were shutting down. The company was also facing competition from major supermarkets, such as Woolworths' Metro60 which was launched in Sydney.

In May 2023, several weeks after closure, Woolworths bought Milkrun, reportedly for $10 million. Woolworths merged the customer bases of Milkrun and Metro60—Woolworths' competitor to Milkrun—and rebranded Metro60 to Milkrun. By July Milkrun was launched in New Zealand, originally only in Wellington and central Auckland. Service rolled out to other regions in the months after.

In November 2024, Milkrun entered a partnership with the Endeavour Group's Jimmy Brings liquor delivery service which saw the Jimmy Brings range added to Milkrun. Jimmy Brings was fully integrated into Milkrun on 28 November 2024 meaning purchases would only be available through Milkrun.

== Operations ==
Milkrun is a grocery delivery platform which says it can deliver within an hour. In New Zealand, orders are subject to a $7 shipping fee, and are picked from Woolworths stores and transported with Uber. Due to this, the delivery drivers are not unionised. Milkrun previously delivered groceries using electric scooters and bikes.
