= Big W =

Australian discount department store chain owned by Woolworths Group

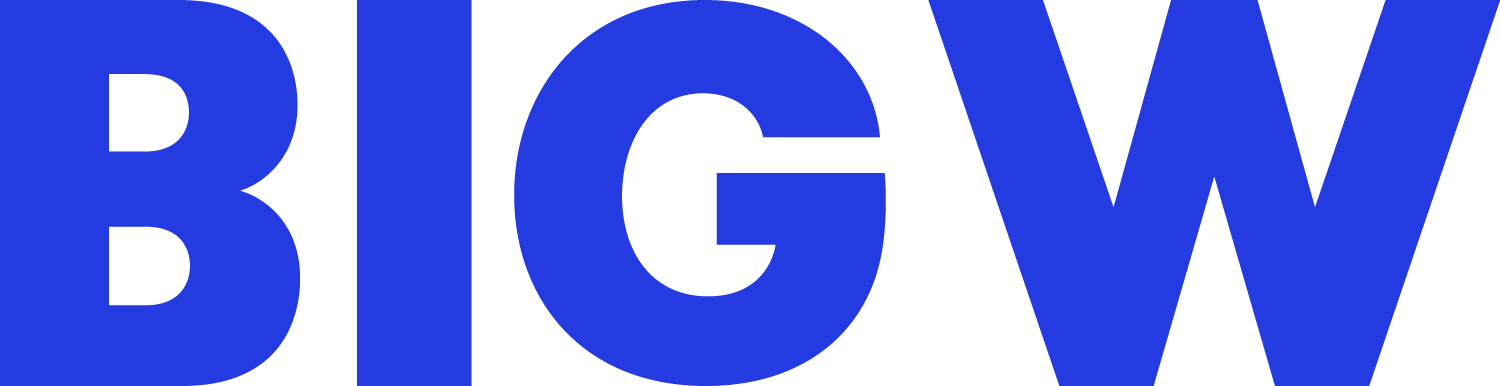

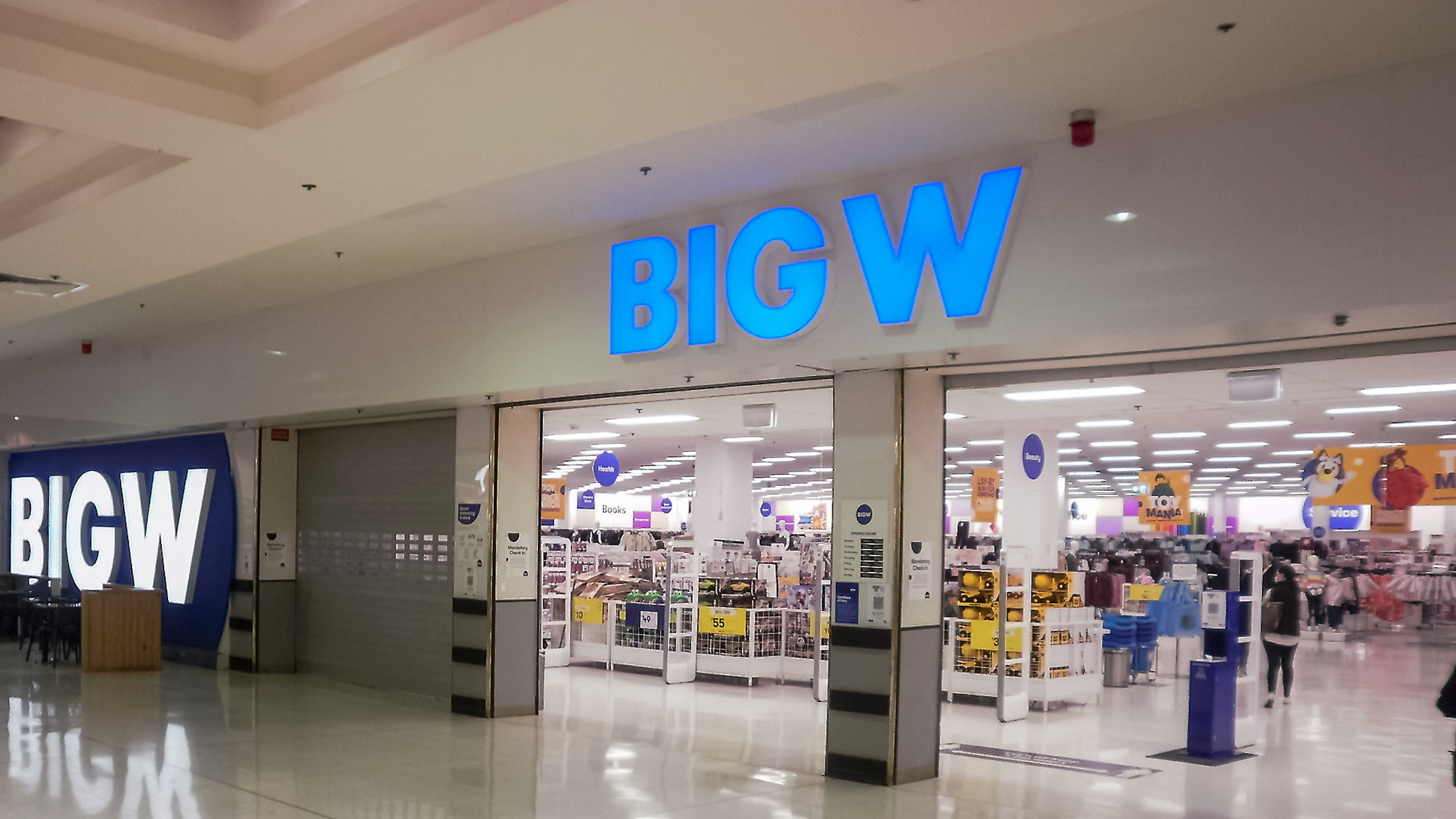
- Big W store at Westfield Southland
- Type: Division
- Industry: Retail
- Founded: 1964; 62 years ago
- Headquarters: Bella Vista, New South Wales, Australia
- Number of locations: 179 stores (2025)
- Key people: Dan Hake (Managing Director)
- Products: Clothing, homewares, electronics, toys, groceries
- Revenue: ▲ A$4.716 billion (2026)
- Operating income: ▲ A$64 million (2026)
- Number of employees: Over 18,000
- Parent: Woolworths Group
- Website: bigw.com.au

Big W (stylised as BIG W) is an Australian chain of discount department stores, which was founded in regional New South Wales in 1964. The company is a division of the Woolworths Group and as of 2024 operated 179 stores, with around 18,000 employees. Big W stocks clothing, health and beauty, bedding, kitchenware, toys, pet items, office items, books, televisions, gaming consoles, video games, some furniture items, snack food and small electrical household appliances both on its website and in retail stores.

In late 2025, Woolworths Group reportedly accelerated plans to divest from Big W, initiating a formal sale process to test market interest as the brand's popularity continued to decline. Despite various turnaround attempts, the discount department store remained a financial drag on the Group, operating at a significant loss, including a reported $35 million EBIT loss for the 2025 financial year. Seeking to exit the underperforming general merchandise sector to focus on its core grocery business, Woolworths has engaged with several potential suitors. Industry analysts have frequently identified the American retail giant Walmart as a primary candidate, alongside prominent private equity firms such as Anchorage Capital Partners, Platinum Equity, and Oaktree. Other firms previously linked to interest in the chain include KKR and TPG Capital, while competitors like Wesfarmers (owner of Kmart and Target in Australia) have historically expressed interest in acquiring specific store leases rather than the brand itself.

Big W's performance improved in the 2026 financial year with the company posting a $64 million EBIT profit, a turnaround from 2025's $33 million loss.

== History ==
The first Big W store opened in 1964 at the Jesmond shopping centre in Newcastle. The original stores were full line department stores similar to a Myer and David Jones. At that time Woolworths still operated several hundred Woolworths Variety stores, which were the original Woolworths stores and carried a small range of general merchandise products.

In 1970 the Big W name ceased to be used and the stores were converted to what were then known as Woolworths Family Centres that had "a very large range of general merchandise as well as a supermarket food range". These stores were ultimately converted to supermarkets in the 1980s.

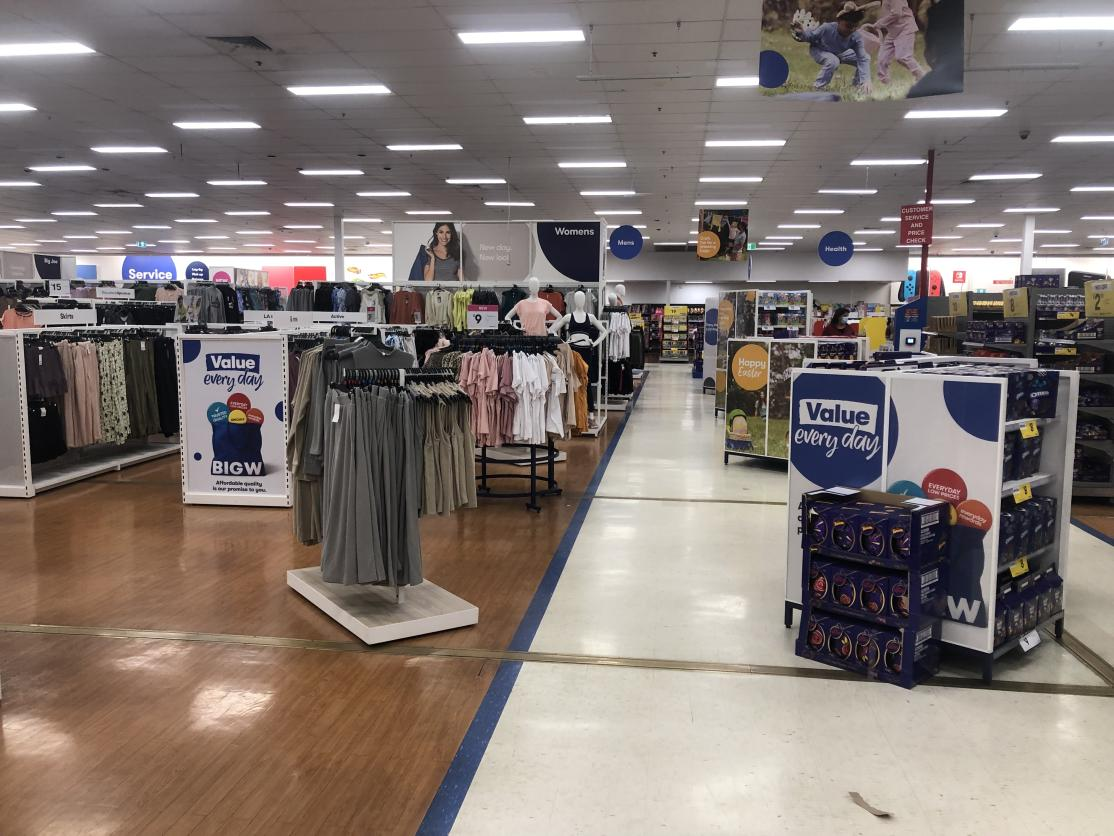
Big W store in Campsie, New South Wales

The Big W name was resurrected with a new store in Tamworth in 1976, which was the first Big W discount department store to open, with the successful discount department store format that continues today.

Woolworths Limited developed the Big W brand to provide Australian shoppers with a broad range of general merchandise products in a dedicated one-stop-shop. Big W's name reflects the complementary relationship it has with Woolworths and the W stands for Woolworths.

The separation of Big W and Woolworths supermarkets was largely completed by 1989, although a few Woolworths Variety stores continued to operate into the 90s (such as the one in Rundle Mall, Adelaide).

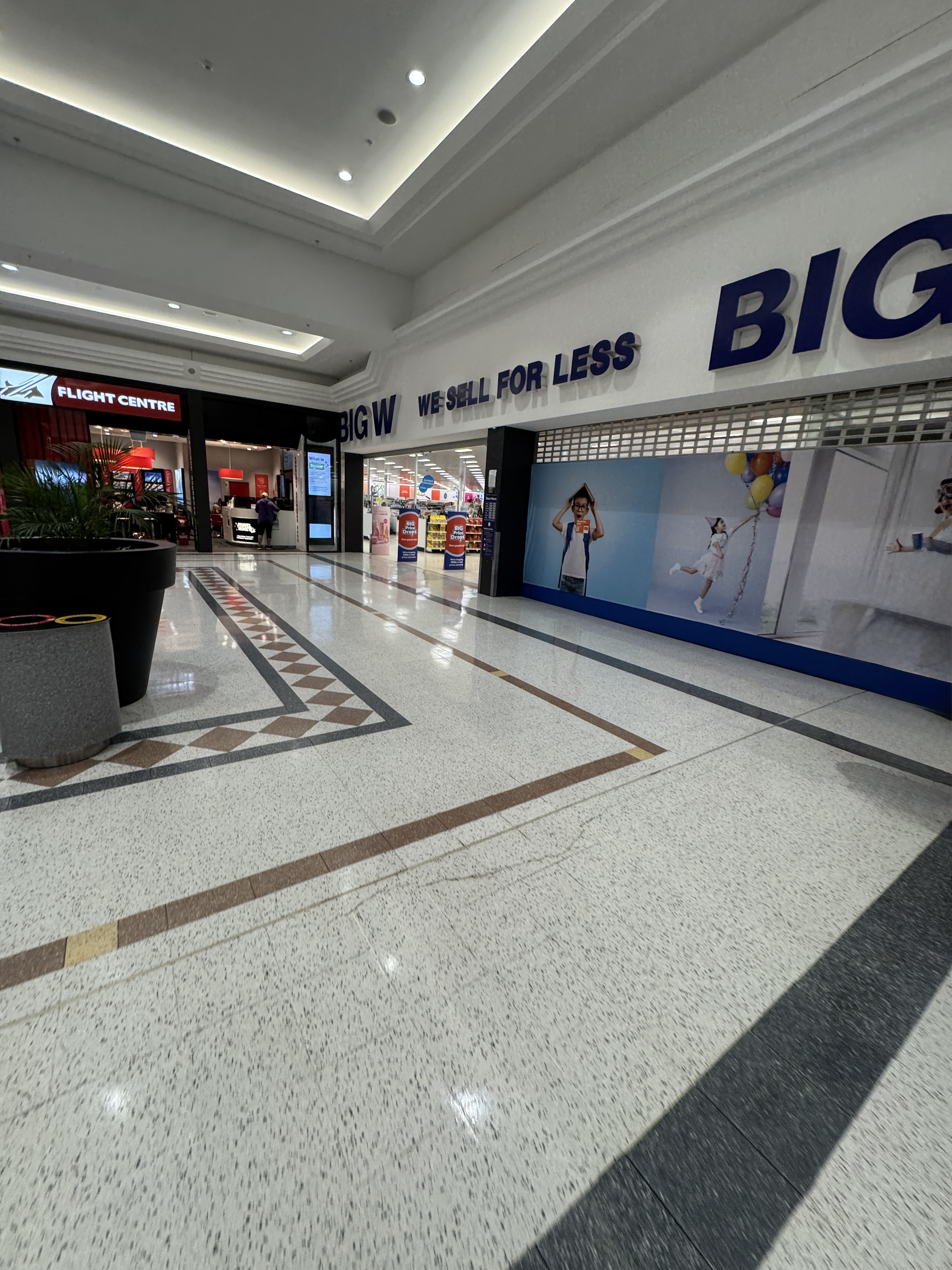
Whitford City's Big W entry still sports 1990's 'We Sell For Less' branding.

In August 2022, Big W opened its first small format store in Town Hall, Sydney.

In November 2023, the company launched Big W Market, an online marketplace for third-party businesses to sell their products.

== Services ==
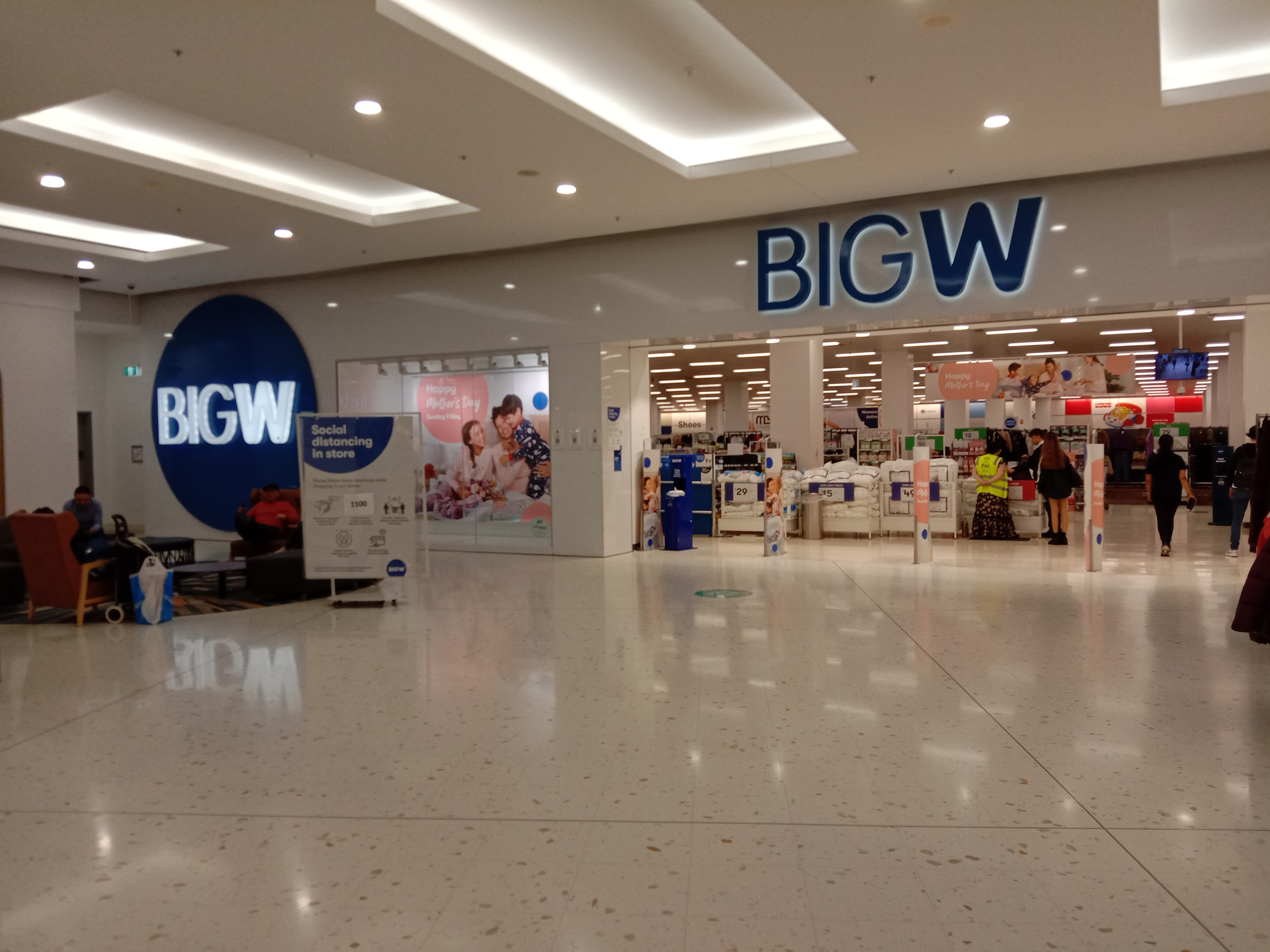
A Big W store at Top Ryde City

Ever since its modern format stores in 1976, Big W stores featured garden centres similar to Kmart and Target. These facilities continued to be added throughout its store portfolio throughout the 1980s and early 2000s until they started being added to only a select few stores in the mid-late 2000s, until being retired completely in the late 2010s. Around 2023, Big W began phasing out its garden centres entirely, citing poor sales on live plants. Stores still stock a range of gardening equipment and products such as seeds, fertiliser, herbicides etc.

Big W were the second company in Australia to use self-checkouts, which were introduced in 2003 on a trial basis in two of Sydney's major stores and began expanding throughout Australia in late 2005.

In August 2014, Big W launched its first party store at Rouse Hill Town Centre in New South Wales and its second at the newly refurbished Macquarie Centre, also in New South Wales. There are currently 176 stores across Australia.

In 2022, Big W phased out its in-store photo printing service citing declining demand and a growth in online photo ordering. Prints can still be ordered online and collected in-store.

=== Former services ===
In 2007, Big W began trialling optometry services in South Australia and since then, these services had been added to selected stores in Queensland, Victoria, New South Wales, Tasmania and the Australian Capital Territory. In May 2019, Big W announced the closure of all 41 Big W Optometry stores, along with 175 job losses. This would not affect the Big W store that housed the optometry department, and that the last optometry sessions could be held in late July. As of August 2019, all optometry stores have closed, leaving separate stores to be leased or stores within the Big W store to be used as space for another department.
