= Dan Murphy's =

Australian liquor store chain owned by Endeavour Group

- Type: Subsidiary
- Industry: Retail
- Founded: 1952; 74 years ago
- Headquarters: Richmond, Victoria, Australia
- Number of locations: 286 stores (2026)
- Key people: Eloise Ward (managing director)
- Number of employees: 6,000 (approx.)
- Parent: Endeavour Group
- Website: danmurphys.com.au

Dan Murphy's is an Australian liquor store owned by Endeavour Group, with 283 stores across Australia. The business was founded in 1952 by winemaker Daniel Francis Murphy. Dan Murphy's competes principally with Coles Group brands First Choice Liquor, Vintage Cellars and Liquorland.

== History ==
Daniel Francis Murphy, a winemaker, journalist and founder of the first wine club in Australia, learned the trade working in a liquor store owned by his father, Timothy Murphy. Following a brief active stint in the RAAF, serving as a Flight Sergeant, Murphy opened his first liquor store in 1952. Located on Prahran's Chapel Street, it was just a few hundred metres away from his father's store. Murphy was heavily involved in the Australian wine industry, and he was a friend to influential winemakers, including Maurice O'Shea and Max Schubert.

After growing his business to five stores across Victoria, Murphy sold his business to Woolworths in 1998. The business has since contributed to the formation of an oligopoly in the Australian liquor market, with concerns about the ability of smaller liquor retailers to compete.

In 2019, Woolworths restructured its alcoholic drinks business to form the Endeavour Group. In June 2021, the Endeavour Group was listed as a separate entity on the Australian Securities Exchange. As well as retail brands BWS, Dan Murphy's and Langton's, it owns Australia's largest portfolio of hotels.

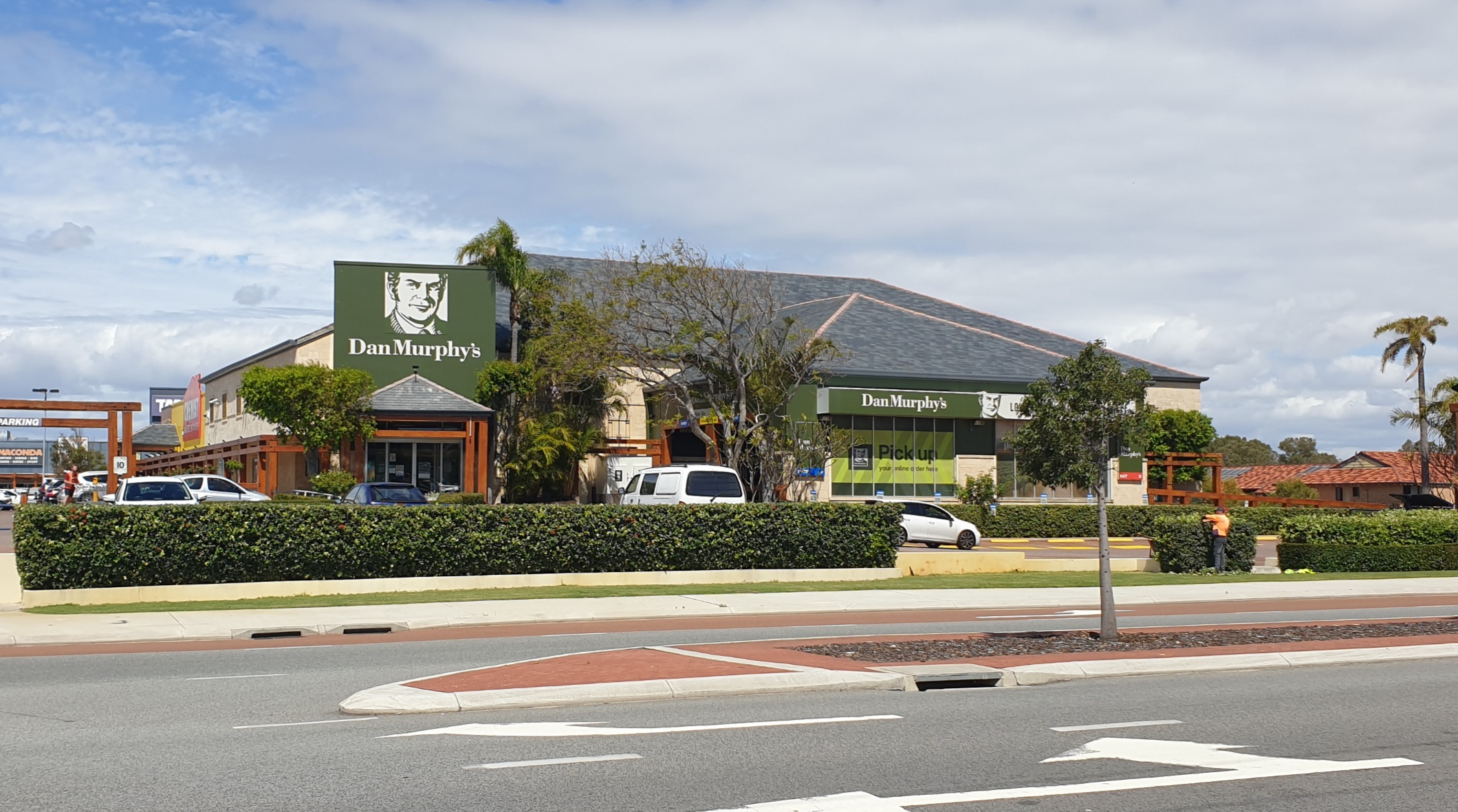
Dan Murphy's store in Innaloo, Western Australia

The Dan Murphy's branding is led by a green-and-white illustrated bust of founder Daniel Murphy and a serif logotype. The brand was named the #1 most meaningfully different brand in Australia for 2020 in the Kantar BrandZ ranking.

== Stores ==
As of June 2025, there are 283 Dan Murphy's stores operating across Australia.

In addition to its physical stores, Dan Murphy's also operates danmurphys.com.au, which is responsible for more than 50% of online sales of alcohol in Australia.

In 2016, Woolworths opened The Dan Murphy's Cellar. Located in the cellar of Dan Murphy's original Prahran store, The Cellar focusses on boutique and premium liquor products.

== Loyalty program ==
My Dan's is the name of Dan Murphy's loyalty program. As of March 25, 2025, it had over 5.5 million active members.

== Criticism ==
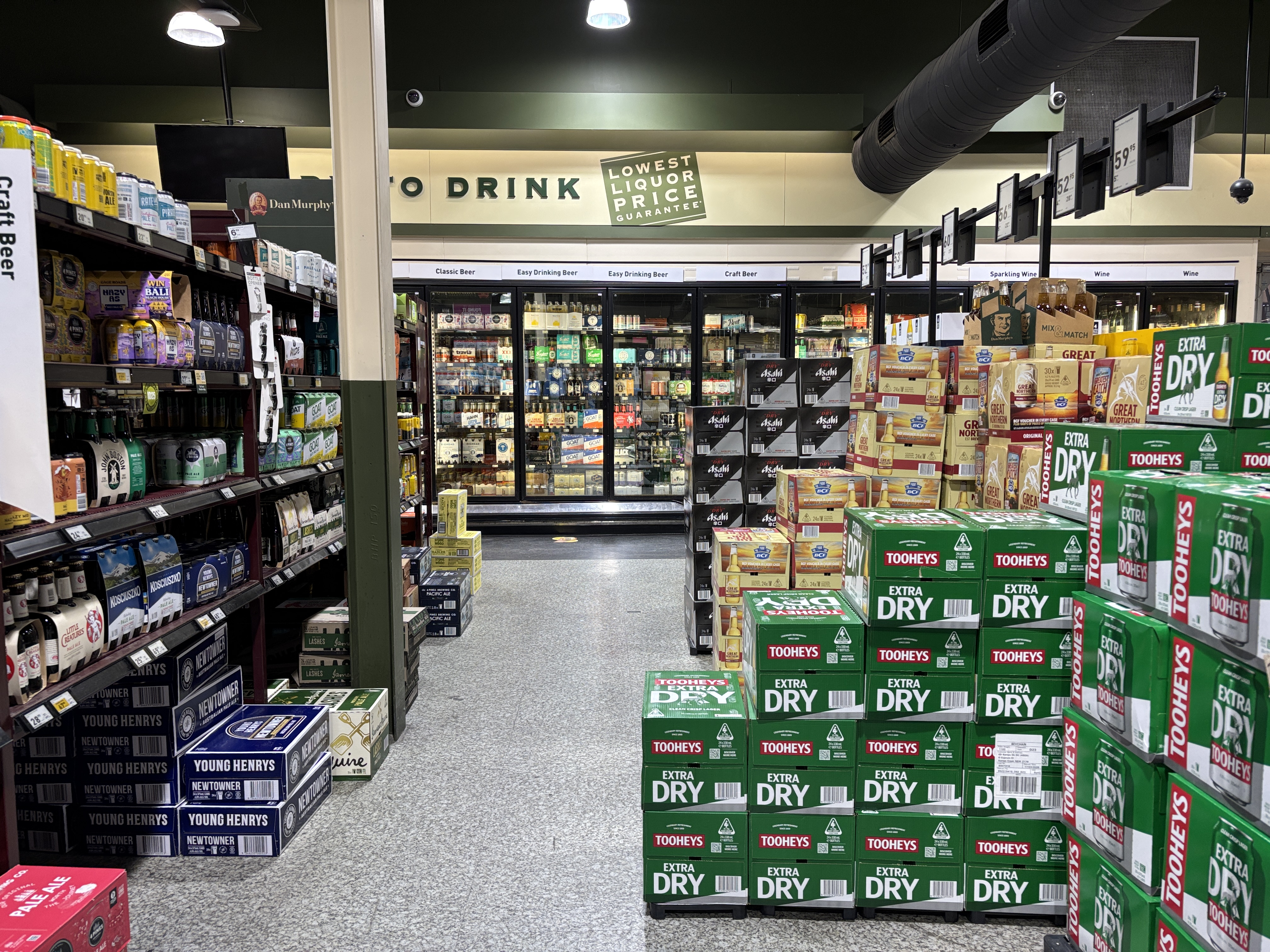
Beer for sale in a Dan Murphy's store in Canberra

Dan Murphy's pricing strategy sparked an anti-competition problem in 2003, with industry analysts claiming that Woolworths and Coles were seeking to bankrupt rival liquor retailers, mostly by lowering prices of wine. The business has admitted to selling liquor at times below cost to "aggressively drive sales". The original Daniel Murphy had a similar strategy, with his below-cost marketing being cross-subsidised by fraudulent avoidance of sales tax to the detriment of his competitors, who could not match his prices.

Another major concern amongst rival liquor retailers has been Woolworths' aggressive acquisition strategy, buying up small independent stores to increase market share against main rival Coles Group, or opening up new stores, placing pressure on existing retailers by taking away sales. In Woolworths' 2006 Annual Report, the company reported 15 new Dan Murphy's stores had opened in the reported financial year, taking the total to 56, and that the company had the sites and licences to have more than 100 stores open within the next two to three years.
