= BWS (liquor retailer) =

Australian liquor store chain owned by Endeavour Group

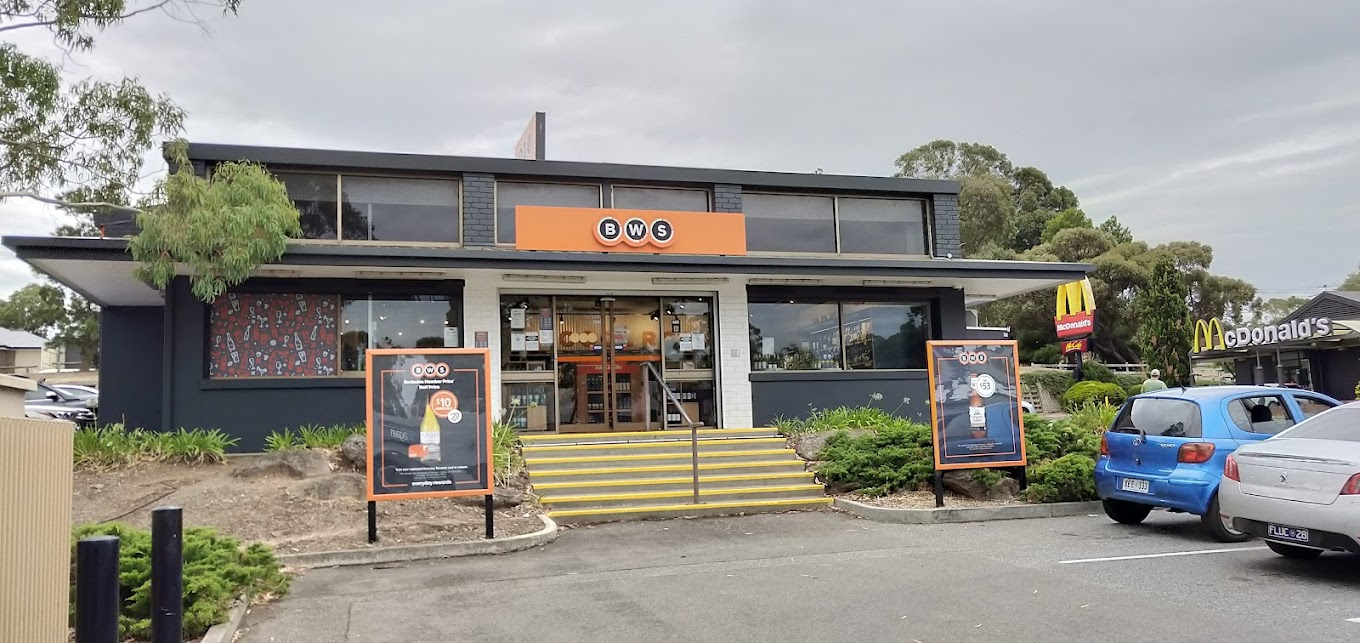
- BWS Shop in Happy Valley
- Type: Subsidiary
- Industry: Retail
- Predecessor: Woolworths Liquor
- Founded: June 2001; 25 years ago
- Headquarters: Bella Vista, New South Wales, Australia
- Number of locations: 1,455 stores (2026)
- Key people: Scott Davidson (Managing Director)
- Parent: Endeavour Group
- Website: www.bws.com.au

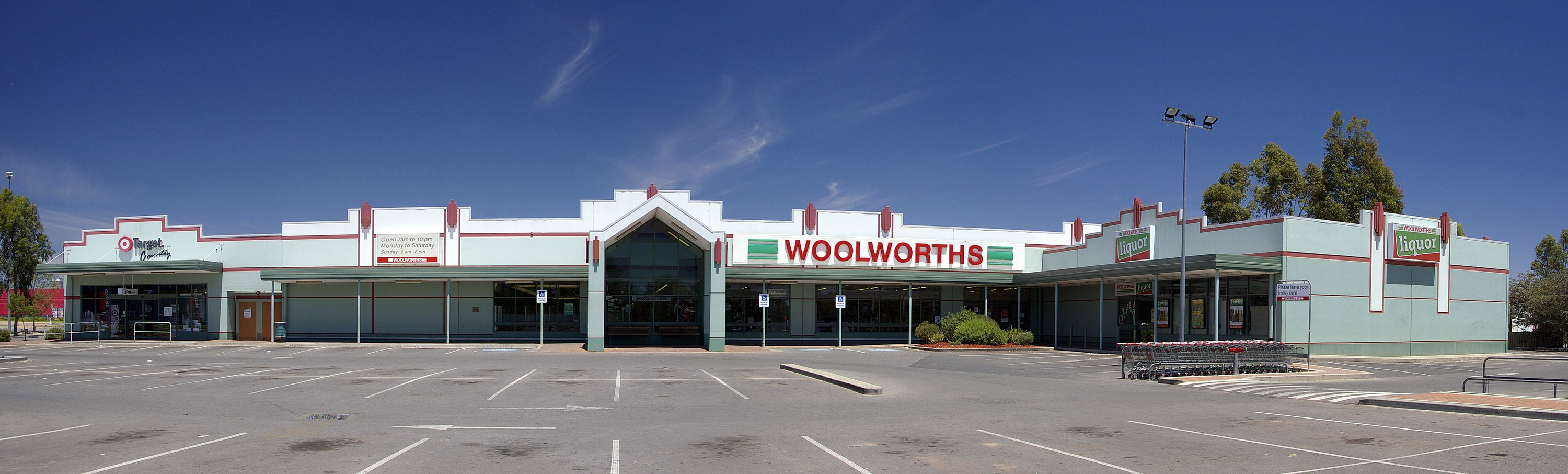
A Woolworths supermarket with adjoining Woolworths Liquor at Leeton, New South Wales in 2008. The liquor store has since been rebranded to BWS as part of a nationwide rebranding.

BWS is an Australian retail chain of liquor stores owned by Endeavour Group.

== History ==
BWS began operations in June 2001 as a local neighbourhood bottleshop. BWS was a brand of the Woolworths Liquor Group which also included Dan Murphy's, Cellarmasters and Pinnacle Liquor. The freestanding liquor division of Woolworths was distinguished from the Woolworths Supermarket Liquor and Safeway Liquor stores, in that it stood alone from Supermarkets. The first BWS was opened in Cabramatta, Sydney, the site of a Woolworths owned Mac's Liquor Store. The Safeway brand including Safeway Liquor was later also rebranded Woolworths and Woolworths Liquor respectively.

In 2012, Woolworths Liquor and BWS shared all promotions, prices and specials between the two brands. All 475 Woolworths Supermarket Liquor stores were rebranded to BWS by 2013, resulting in a network of 1,180 BWS stores after the rebranding. These stores now operate as free standing BWS stores, financially and managerially separate from the adjacent Woolworths supermarkets. A handful are known to be adjacent to Coles Supermarkets, such as in Mount Warren Park in Queensland, Earlwood, New South Wales, Braybrook, Victoria, and Marion, South Australia

As of June 2014, BWS has over 1,200 stores Australia wide, a majority including the ALH Group sites. They recently have been buying and converting independent liquor stores such as Darlinghurst Cellars along Oxford Street near Hyde Park, Sydney. BWS owns several beer brands including John Boston, Tun, Arc Valley and Sail & Anchor through Pinnacle Drinks.

As of 2017, BWS has over 1,300 stores Australia wide. As of April 2019, BWS has 1,355 stores Australia wide.

In 2019, Woolworths restructured its alcoholic drinks business to form Endeavour Group, including BWS. Endeavour Group demerged from Woolworths Group in June 2021.

== Advertising and branding ==
In 2023, BWS launched the "Refreshingly BWS" platform through creative agencies M&C Saatchi and media agency Carat. This initiative aimed to challenge traditional bottle shop norms and appeal to Gen Z and young millennials by embracing a cheeky and welcoming tone. The campaign encourages Australians to enjoy drinks their way, promoting a judgment-free and fun approach to alcohol consumption.
