= Endeavour Group =

Australian liquor retail company

Endeavour Group Ltd
- Traded as: ASX: EDV
- Industry: Retail
- Founded: 2019; 7 years ago
- Founder: Woolworths Group
- Headquarters: Sydney, Australia
- Key people: Jayne Hrdlicka (CEO); Duncan Makeig (Chairman)
- Revenue: $1.4 billion (2021)
- Net income: $261 million (2021)
- Number of employees: 28,000 (2021)
- Subsidiaries: See below
- Website: endeavourgroup.com.au

Endeavour Group Ltd (EG) is an Australian alcoholic drinks retailer, hotel operator, and poker machine operator that was spun off from Woolworths Group in 2019.

== History ==
In 2019, Woolworths restructured its alcoholic drinks business to form Endeavour Group. In June 2021, the Endeavour Group was listed as a separate entity on the Australian Securities Exchange. Woolworths sold its remaining 4.1% stake of Endeavour in September 2024. Meanwhile Bruce Mathieson is one of the notable shareholders of Endeavour, which owns 15.08% as of 2025.

In April 2023, Endeavour invested $3 million in esports company Fortress.

In August 2023, the Victorian Gambling and Casino Control Commission fined Australian Leisure and Hospitality Group $550,000 after finding the company had run 220 gaming machines across 62 venues in the state without installing the mandatory harm reduction technology YourPlay.

Following the resignation of Steve Donohue as Chief Executive Office in September 2024, it was announced in April 2025 that former Virgin Australia CEO Jayne Hrdlicka had been appointed as Endeavour Groups CEO, to commence on 1 January 2026.

In 2026, the group withdrew from producing wines themselves.

== Subsidiaries ==
Subsidiaries include:

- Australian Leisure and Hospitality Group
- BWS
- Cellarmasters
- Dan Murphy's
- Jimmy Brings
- Langton's
- Paragon Wine Estates
- Pinnacle Drinks
- Shorty's Liquor

=== Australian Leisure and Hospitality Group ===
The Australian Leisure and Hospitality Group is Endeavour's hospitality arm. As of 2025, it owns 350 hotels. These include:

- Australian National Hotel, Brisbane
- Breakfast Creek Hotel, Brisbane
- Hotel Cecil, Gold Coast
- Royal Exchange Hotel, Brisbane
- Sail and Anchor Hotel, Fremantle
- Surfers Paradise Beer Garden, Gold Coast
- Victory Hotel, Brisbane
- Young & Jackson, Melbourne

=== Cellarmasters ===
Cellarmasters was acquired by Woolworths from Archer Capital in 2011 for $340 million. The company was founded in 1982 by David Thomas.

=== Dan Murphy's ===
Dan Murphy's is a liquor store chain. As of June 2025, there are 283 Dan Murphy's stores in Australia.

=== Jimmy Brings ===
Jimmy Brings is a liquor delivery business founded in 2011 by Nathan Besser and David Berger. The business was acquired by Woolworths in December 2017. The company expanded its range to include non-liquor drinks, snacks and convenience items in 2022. In November 2024, Jimmy Brings entered a partnership with the Woolworths Group's Milkrun delivery service which saw the Jimmy Brings range added to Milkrun. Jimmy Brings was fully integrated into Milkrun on 28 November 2024 meaning purchases were only to be available through Milkrun.

=== Premium Wine Portfolio ===
Endeavour's premium wine portfolio was established in September 2019 to house existing Endeavour brands Krondorf, Isabel Estate, Riddoch and the newly-acquired Chapel Hill. Paragon acquired Yarra Valley winery Oakridge Wines in March 2021, Tasmanian winery Josef Chromy Wines in May 2022, McLaren Vale's Shingleback Wine in August 2022, and Margaret River winery Cape Mentelle Vineyards in January 2023.

=== Shorty's Liquor ===
Shorty's Liquor was founded in 2001 by David Short. It is a liquor delivery business focused on business and corporate customers. Woolworths purchased a majority stake in the company in 2020. The business was merged into Dan Murphy's B2B services in 2025.
