= Woolworths Group =

Australian retail conglomerate

Woolworths Group Limited
- Logo used since 2022

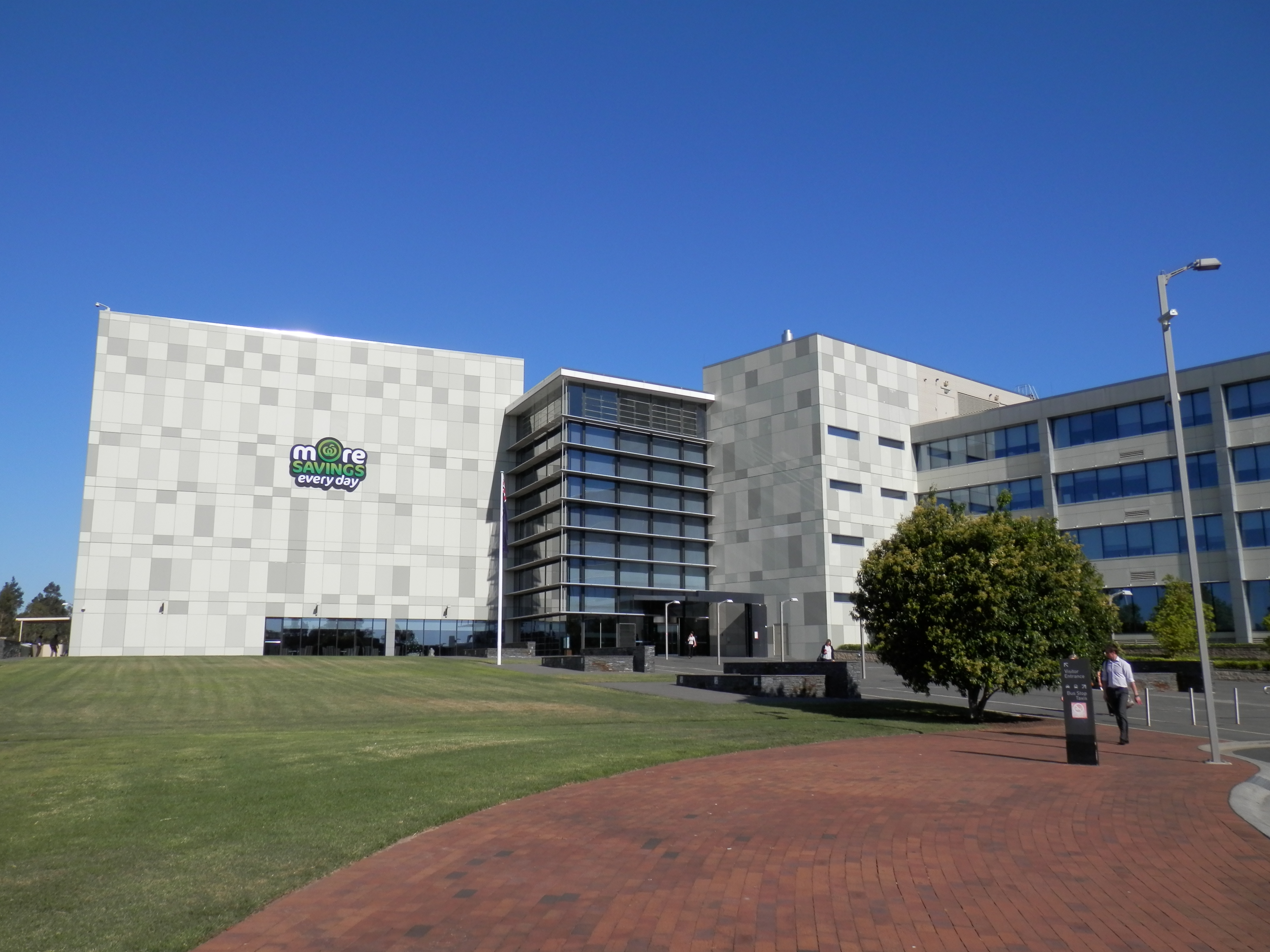
- Headquarters at Norwest Business Park
- Trade name: Woolworths Limited (1924–2017); Woolworths Group (2017–present)
- Type: Public company
- Traded as: ASX: WOW
- Industry: Retail
- Founded: 22 September 1924; 102 years ago
- Founders: Percy Christmas; Stanley Chatterton; Cecil Scott Waine; George Creed; Ernest Williams
- Headquarters: Bella Vista, New South Wales, Australia
- Number of locations: 1,824 stores (2025)
- Area served: Australia, New Zealand
- Key people: Scott Perkins (Chairman); Amanda Bardwell (Chief Executive Officer)
- Revenue: ▲ A$69.077 billion (2025)
- Operating income: ▲ A$2.185 billion (2025)
- Net income: ▲ A$953 million (2025)
- Total assets: ▼ A$33.829 billion (2025)
- Total equity: ▼ A$4.962 billion (2025)
- Number of employees: 202,846 (2025)
- Divisions: Woolworths (Australia); Woolworths (New Zealand); Woolworths Metro; Big W; MyDeal; Everyday Market; Big W Market; Everyday Rewards
- Subsidiaries: List of Woolworths Group companies
- Website: Official website

Logo used until 2017

Woolworths Group Limited is an Australian multinational retail and financial services company, currently headquartered in Bella Vista, New South Wales, a suburb of Sydney.

The group operates the Woolworths supermarket chain in Australia and New Zealand, as well as the smaller Woolworths Metro chain. The group operates the Big W discount department store chain in Australia. In New Zealand, the group operates the SuperValue and FreshChoice supermarkets. The group also owns the Everyday Rewards program, serving both Australia and New Zealand.

The company and its operations are named in tribute to the original Woolworth business in the United States, but are unrelated.

== History ==
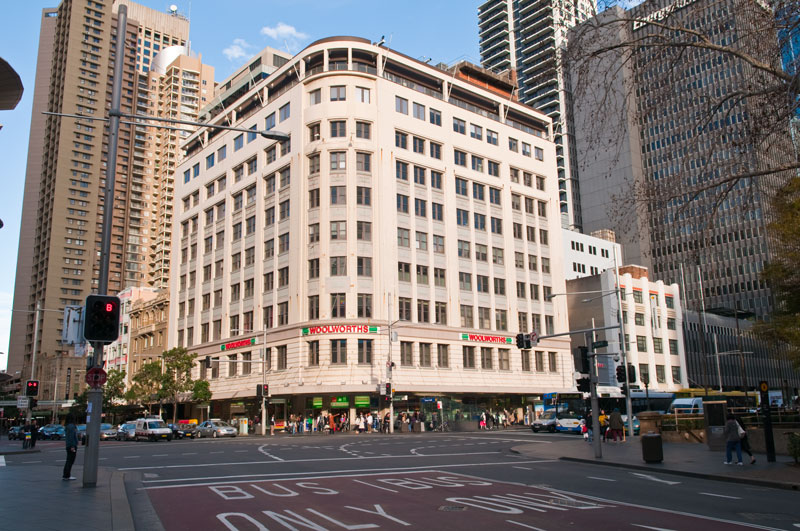
Woolworths and Big W flagship store and former head office in the Sydney CBD

=== Founding and early growth (1924–1957) ===
Woolworths opened its first store, the Woolworths Stupendous Bargain Basement, in the old Imperial Arcade Pitt Street, Sydney, where Westfield Sydney now stands, on 5 December 1924. Woolworths Ltd's nominal capital was £A185,000, and although 85,000 shares were offered to the public, only 81,707 shares were subscribed for by 619 people, including the five founders – Percy Christmas, Stanley Chatterton, Cecil Scott Waine, George Creed and Ernest Williams. One of the founding investors was Preston Lanchester Gowing, the then chairman of the department store chain Gowings.

The name on the draft prospectus drawn up by Cecil Scott Waine was "Walworth's Bazaar" – a play on the name of F.W. Woolworth, the owner of the Woolworth's chain in the United States and United Kingdom. According to Ernest Robert Williams, Percy Christmas dared him to register the name Woolworths instead, which he succeeded in doing after finding out the name was available for use in New South Wales.

The new Woolworths store was the first variety store in the world to use cash registers that print receipts for customers.

During the late 1920s the company grew, with a second store in Sydney and stores in Brisbane, Perth and Wellington in New Zealand. The company grew further in the 1930s, despite the depression, until by the end of 1933 it had 23 stores. In 1933 the first store in Melbourne was opened and on 1 April 1936 the company bought eight stores from Edments Ltd and opened its first store in Adelaide. Following the opening of the Hobart store in 1940, Woolworths had a store in every state in Australia.

World War II slowed the growth of the company, with the Australian and United States militaries commandeering Woolworths' warehouses in Sydney for storage. After the war expansion was once again rapid and in 1955 Woolworths opened its 200th store, in the Civic Centre in Canberra.

=== Diversification, expansion and takeover (1957–1993) ===
In 1957, Woolworths began to diversify from variety retailing when it opened its first food store at Dee Why, Sydney. The company further diversified in 1960, opening it first purpose-built supermarket at Warrawong, purchasing the Rockmans chain of women's clothing stores and commencing selling liquor at some outlets.

In the 1960s, the company opened a department store to compete against the likes of David Jones and Myer, under the brand Big W which was short lived, but the name was resurrected in the 70s as a discount department store as we know it today. Woolworths also began converting its variety stores to supermarkets and removing many of its variety products from sale. In 1979, Woolworths sold its New Zealand operations to LD Nathan & Co.

In 1981, Woolworths purchased 60 percent of consumer electronics retailer Dick Smith, acquiring the rest of the company in 1983 for $25 million.

In 1985, the acquisition of 126 Safeway supermarkets in Victoria, New South Wales and Queensland (including Food Barn branded stores) made Woolworths the largest food retailer in Australia. As part of the purchase of Safeway's Australian stores, Safeway Inc acquired a 20 percent interest in Woolworths Limited. In 1989, the last of the Woolworths Variety stores was closed and Woolworths "Family Centres" were split into separate Big W discount stores and Woolworths branded supermarket stores.

Woolworths Limited was acquired by Industrial Equity Limited in 1989, a consortium of Adelaide Steamship Company, David Jones and Tooth & Co.

=== IPO and further diversification and expansion (1993–2012) ===
In 1993, Industrial Equity floated Woolworths on Australian Securities Exchange in what was then the biggest initial public share offering in Australia's history.

In 1996, Woolworths entered the petrol retailing market, initially with wholly owned Plus Petrol outlets located in shopping centre parking lots. Woolworths expanded its liquor retailing portfolio with the acquisition of the Dan Murphy's liquor barn stores in 1998. In 1999, Woolworths began a joint venture with the Commonwealth Bank called Woolworths Ezy Banking, which was scaled back by 2006.

In 2001, Woolworths expanded its consumer electronics retailing interests with the purchase of the Tandy chain in Australia from InterTan. Also in 2001, Woolworths established the smaller format liquor retailing chain BWS to complement its big-box liquor retailer Dan Murphys.

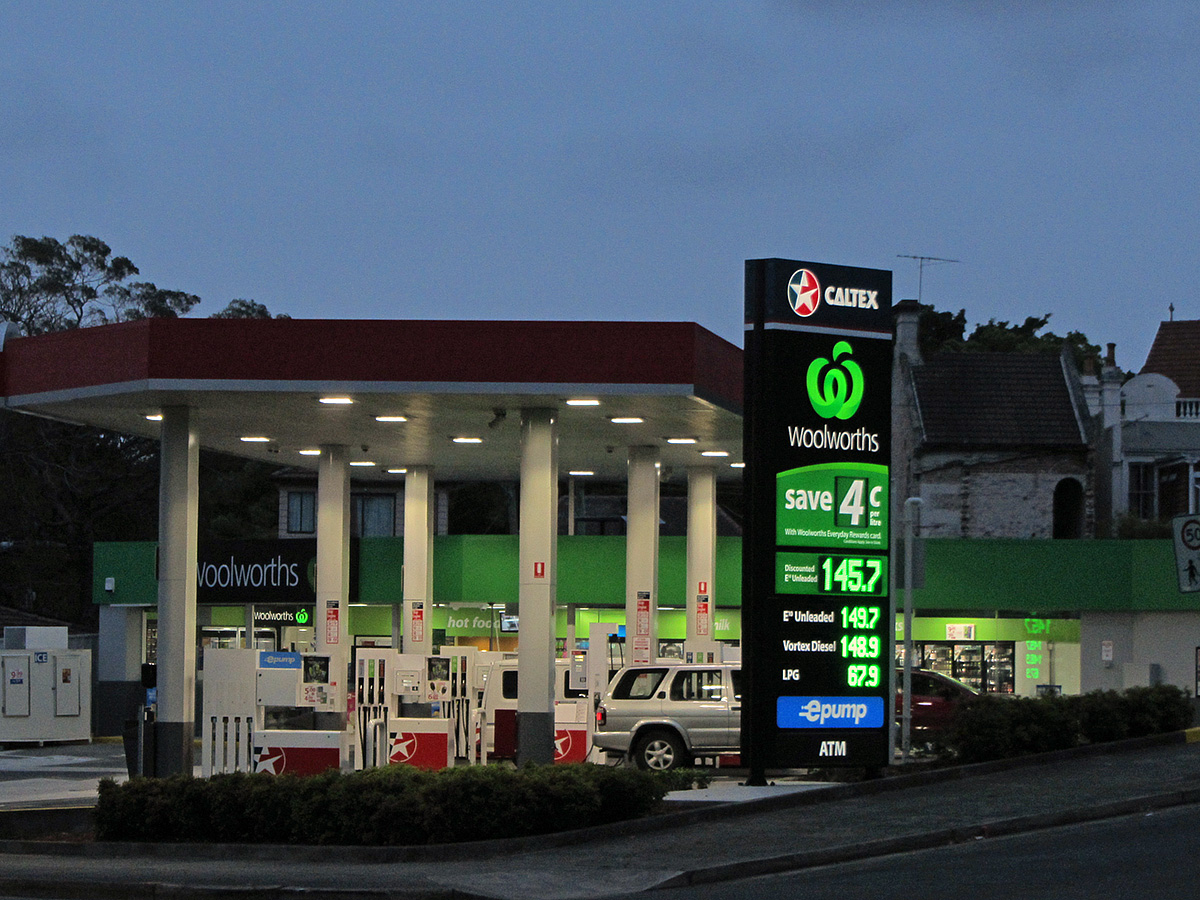
A Caltex Woolworths petrol station in Lewisham, New South Wales

In 2003, Woolworths entered into an agreement with Caltex to jointly supply food and groceries to Woolworths owned petrol stations and selected Caltex sites near Woolworths supermarkets, with petrol stations covered by the joint venture co-branded as Caltex Woolworths.

With Queensland licensing laws dictating that liquor retail outlets must be operated by a hotelier, Woolworths moved into the hotel industry in 2004 by acquiring 75 percent of the Australian Leisure and Hospitality Group (ALH) in a joint venture with business partner Bruce Mathieson. In 2005, Woolworths expanded its portfolio to 250 hotels by acquiring the Taverner Hotel Group. Statistics provided during the acquisition of the Taverner group showed that over one-third of sales were made up of gaming/pokie machine takings (slot machines) with the total number of pokie machines owned by ALH after its acquisitions being 10,722.

In 2005, Woolworths re-entered the New Zealand market by purchasing the retailer Progressive Enterprises, owner of supermarket brands including Countdown, in a deal that gave the company a 45 percent share of the New Zealand grocery sector. In the same deal, the company also acquired 22 Action supermarket stores in Western Australia, bringing the total number of Woolworths supermarkets in Australia to near 750. In 2006, Woolworths announced that it had taken a 10 percent strategic stake in The Warehouse Group in New Zealand and announced a joint venture with the Tata Group to introduce the Dick Smiths Electronics store format in India.

In August 2007, Woolworths announced that it was planning to launch a general purpose credit card in 2008. It is expected to offer credit cardholders reward vouchers redeemable through its store network. HSBC was subsequently named as its credit card partner. Woolworths subsequently announced that the Woolworths Everyday Money MasterCard would be launched on 26 August 2008 and allows customers to earn shopping cards redeemable at Woolworths group retailers. It was suggested Woolworths could earn approximately $20m from credit cards in three years and that it was targeting 100,000 to 150,000 cardholders in the first year.

In April 2008, Woolworths launched Thomas Dux, a gourmet grocer and deli. After the company purchased the Macro Wholefoods organic grocery chain in May 2009, it converted eight stores to Thomas Dux stores. In February 2011, Woolworths announced it would acquire the Cellarmasters liquor business for $340 million. During 2009, Woolworths and American retailer Lowe's purchased Danks Ltd owners of the Home Timber and Hardware brand and then entered into a joint venture to launch a new hardware brand named Masters Home Improvement. The first of these stores were opened to the public in Braybrook, Melbourne, on 1 September 2011.

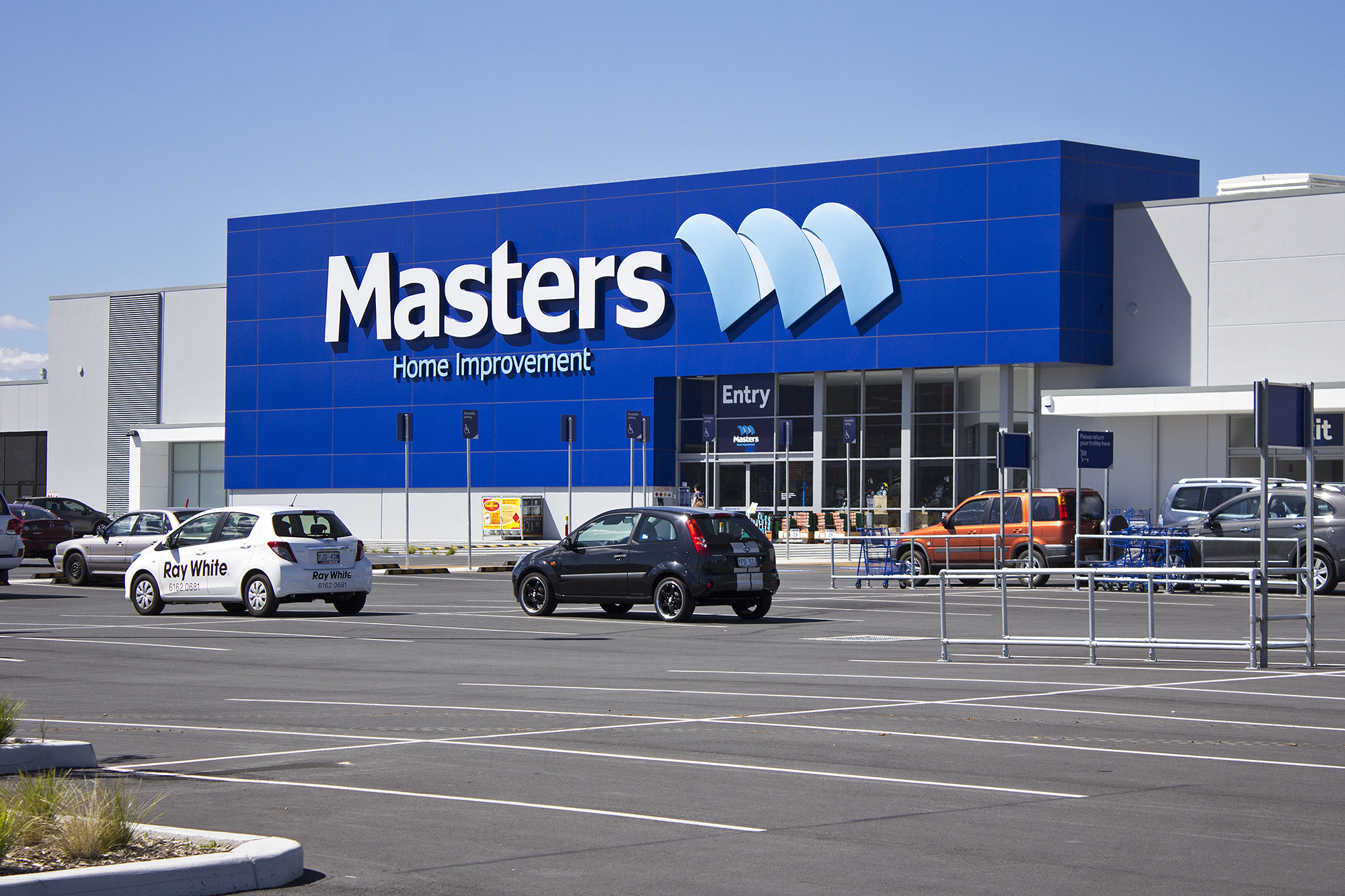
A Masters Home Improvement store in Majura

=== Consolidation (2012–2019) ===
In 2012, Woolworths placed 69 shopping centres it owned into a real estate investment trust known as Shopping Centres Australasia Property Group (SCA Property Group), which listed as a separate entity on the ASX on 26 November 2012. Most of the locations contain a Woolworths owned store as an anchor tenant, with the trust deriving most of its rental income from Woolworths Limited stores. Woolworths announced it was exiting the consumer electronics retailing sector in September 2012, completing the sale of its Indian electronics wholesale business to Infiniti Retail for A35 million and the sale of the Dick Smith Electronics chain to Anchorage Capital Partners for $20 million. In May 2013, Woolworths acquired a 50 percent stake in analytics firm Quantium for $20 million. In December 2014, Woolworths acquired Summergate, an alcoholic drinks distributor in China for $27 million.

In 2015, Woolworths' home improvement chain Masters posted a loss of A$227.4 million and on 18 January 2016 Woolworths announced that it intended to "either sell or wind up" Masters hardware and Home Timber and Hardware. Chairman Gordon Cairns said that it would take years to become profitable and that the ongoing losses could not be sustained. On 24 August 2016, it was announced that all Masters stores would close on or before 11 December 2016. It was also announced that Woolworths would sell the Home Timber and Hardware brand to Metcash.

In June 2015, CEO Grant O'Brien retired and Woolworths went without a CEO until the appointment of Brad Banducci in February 2016. On 25 August 2016, the company announced a loss of $1.235 billion for the 2016 financial year, the biggest loss in the more than 20 years since it has been publicly listed on the Australian Securities Exchange, mainly due to more than $2 billion in write-downs of the failed Masters Home Improvement business and losses in the Big W business.

In April 2016, Woolworths Liquor Group was renamed Endeavour Drinks Group. Woolworths closed all its Thomas Dux stores in 2017; at its peak the brand had 11 stores.

In December 2016, Woolworths announced it would sell its Caltex Woolworths branded petrol stations to British multinational oil and gas company BP for $1.75 billion. BP pulled out of the deal in July 2018, saying that sale conditions imposed by the Australian Competition & Consumer Commission would make the acquisition commercially unviable. On 9 November 2018, Woolworths announced it would instead sell its petrol stations to the EG Group for $1.72 billion, with a 15-year agreement that EG Australia would maintain the Woolworths fuel discount program and enable Woolworths Rewards points to continue to be earned on fuel transactions in its stores. The acquisition was completed on 1 April 2019.

=== New ventures (2019–present) ===
In March 2019, Woolworths launched a stand-alone media business called Cartology to communicate with supplier partners and customers. In April 2019, Woolworths established a venture capital arm called W23.

In July 2019, the Woolworths announced the merger of its hospitality and liquor interests, including BWS, Cellarmasters, Jimmy Brings, Dan Murphy's and ALH into a single company, Endeavour Drinks, with Woolworths holding an 85 percent stake in the new entity. Woolworths indicated that it would explore options to divest the newly created Endeavour Drinks business in 2020, subject to shareholder approval at an annual general meeting. Also in 2019, Woolworths admitted to having underpaid its employees by millions of dollars. In 2021, it was revealed that the Woolworths underpayment of staff was more extensive than first thought. More specifically, it was discovered that Woolworths underpaid salaried managers over $700,000 and the Fair Work Ombudsman looked into this further.

In August 2020, Woolworths announced a $552 million deal to purchase a 65 percent stake in foodservice distributor PFD Food Services, along with the entirety of PFD's property portfolio, as part of the company's push to expand into the business-to-business wholesale market. In June 2021, the Australian Competition & Consumer Commission announced that it would not oppose Woolworths' PFD deal due to insufficient evidence that the deal would cause a substantial lessening of competition. In 2020, Woolworths was found to have repeatedly ignored consumers who had tried to prevent receipt of marketing emails and had not attempted to improve, despite the AMCA notifying the company that they had received customer complaints. The company was fined $1 million.

In September 2020, Woolworths and pet insurance company PetSure signed a deal to launch a new joint venture called PetCulture. The online business would sell pet insurance, pet food and pet-related products, and veterinary services. Woolworths owns 60 percent of the venture. PetCulture launched in April 2021. That month, Woolworths also paid $223 million to increased its stake in Quantium from 47 percent to 75 percent. Following the transaction, Woolworths and Quantium established a new joint data science and advanced analytics business called Wiq. In October 2020, Woolworths rebranded its supply chain function as Primary Connect with the goal of evolving it into an end-to-end service provider for the group as well as external businesses. In February 2021, Woolworths restructured its red meat business, creating a new standalone division called GreenStock. In 2021, Woolworths launched HealthyLife, an online platform which offers health and wellness advice, products and services.

Having been delayed by the COVID-19 pandemic, Woolworths successfully completed the demerger of its alcohol, hotel, and gambling businesses into a new ASX-listed company, Endeavour Group in June 2021, with the new company holding the Dan Murphy's, BWS, AHL, Cellarmasters and Jimmy Brings brands. After the float, Woolworths held a 14.6 percent stake in Endeavour Group. It sold portions of its stake in December 2022 and April 2024, before divesting completely in August 2024.

In February 2022, Woolworths Group rebranded its logo to better represent "what its collective businesses and platforms stand for today". The company says that it showcases its impact on a "Better Tomorrow [sic]". It was designed by Re, a business design division of UK-based advertising firm M&C Saatchi.

In May 2022, Woolworths announced a $243 million bid to acquire an 80 percent stake in online marketplace MyDeal from its founder, Sean Senvirtne. The acquisition was finalised in September 2022. In July 2022, Cartology announced it had made a deal to acquire targeted advertising company Shopper Media for $150 million. In December 2022, Woolworths Group said it would acquire a 55 percent stake in pet business Petspiration Group (Petstock) for $586 million. That month, it also signed a deal with SuperPharmacy to acquire the company's technology and warehouse assets and rebrand SuperPharmacy's six retail stores as HealthyLife Pharmacy. Woolworths will also provide e-commerce and warehousing services to SuperPharmacy. In March 2023, HealthyLife launched telehealth services through a partnership with Global Health, allowing patients to make appointments with doctors, naturopaths and dietitians. That month, Woolworths also announced it would shut down its export business Woolworths International by the end of June 2023.

In May 2023, Woolworths acquired Milkrun, a fast grocery delivery startup which ceased operations the previous month and competed with the supermarket's Metro60 delivery service. Woolworths rebranded Metro60 as Milkrun.

In July 2023, Woolworths announced that its New Zealand-based Countdown supermarkets would be rebranded as Woolworths over the next three years commencing early 2024. The NZ$400 million rebrand will be accompanied by the launch of the Everyday Rewards programme for New Zealand consumers. In November 2023, Woolworths launched MarketPlus, a platform for businesses to sell products across its MyDeal, Everyday Market, and Big W Market marketplaces.

In February 2024, Woolworths announced that Brad Banducci would retire as CEO in September 2024 and a $781 million loss due to major write-downs. Amanda Bardwell, head of WooliesX, is set to succeed Banducci as CEO.

On 10 January 2024, Woolworths Group announced that Woolworths supermarkets and Big W would no longer be stocking Australia Day-themed merchandise, citing declining demand and the broader discussion about the national holiday. The decision caused some controversy, with Liberal opposition leader Peter Dutton calling for a boycott for its decision and vandalism to two stores in Brisbane.

In July 2024, independent pet shop chain PetO put up its hand to acquire 41 stores and 25 clinics from Petstock after Woolworths was handed an Enforcable Undertaking from the Australian Competition & Consumer Commission following Petstock's unauthorised acquisition of Best Friends Pets, Pet City, Animal Tuckerbox, and Pet and Aquarium Warehouse.

In 2025, the company drew test expressions of interest in Big W or its stores, following multitudinous years of continued losses.

== Operations ==
=== Consumer ===
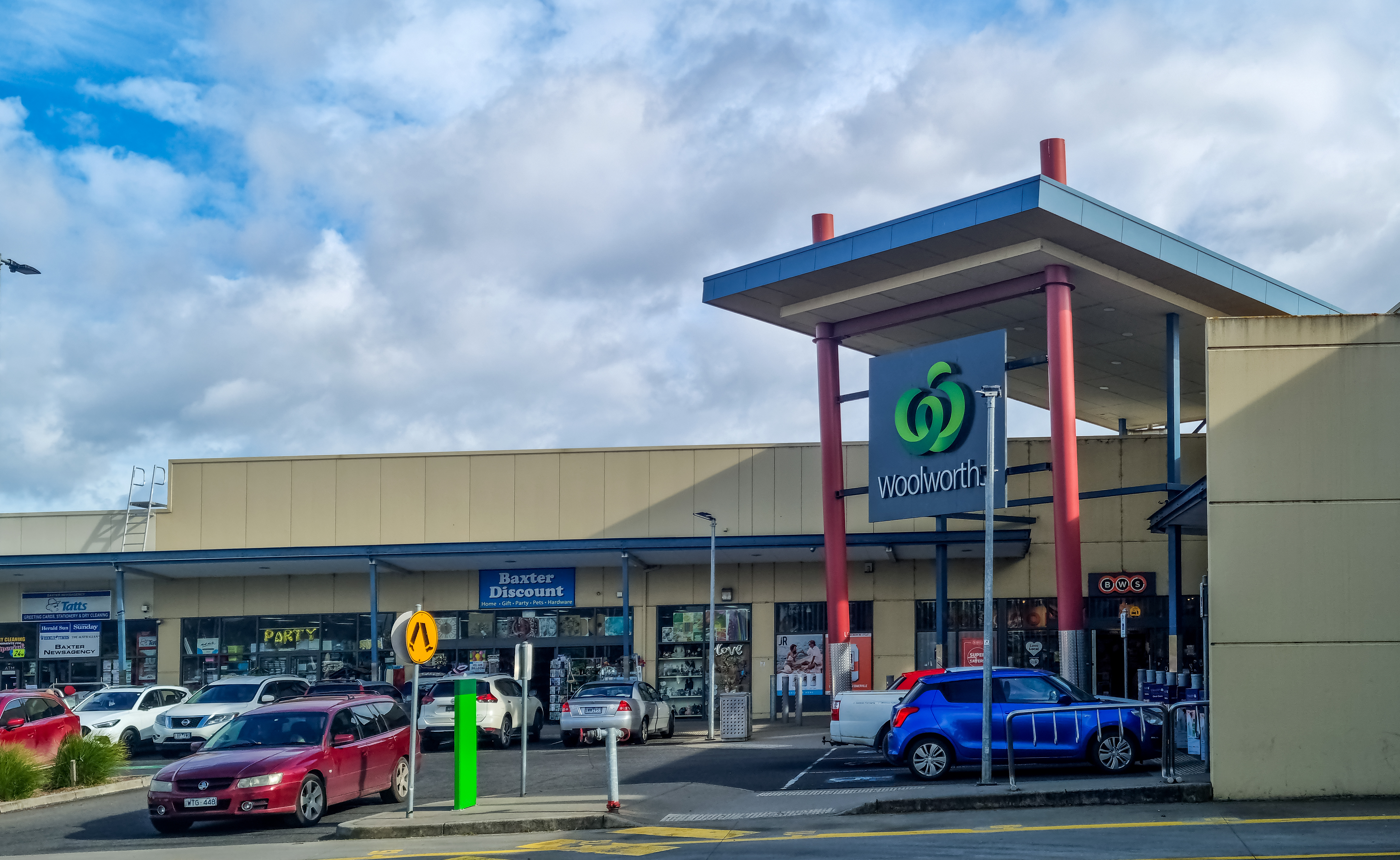
Woolworths Supermarket in Baxter, Victoria

- Woolworths (Australia) – Australia's largest supermarket chain, operating 995 stores across Australia
- Woolworths (New Zealand)
  - Woolworths NZ – Woolworths NZ's flagship supermarket chain. 191 full-service supermarkets, operating across the North and South Islands of New Zealand.
  - SuperValue – franchised convenience supermarket
  - FreshChoice – franchised full-service supermarket
- Big W – Discount department store chain, which sell a wide range of general merchandise
- Everyday Rewards – Customer loyalty program offering discounts, fuel savings and rewards
- Petstock Group (55%) – Australia's second largest specialty pet retailer offering a broad range of pet products and services in-store and online.
- Woolworth Financial Services & Insurance – A range of Woolworth's branded financial products across credit cards, gift cards and insurance
- HealthyLife – Health and wellness online business launched in 2021

=== Business ===
- Woolworths at Work – Online shopping platform aimed at small-to-medium businesses and organisations
- PFD Food Services – Food service distributor which Woolworths acquired a 65 percent stake in August 2020

=== Retail platforms ===
- Cartology – Media business established in March 2019
- Primary Connect – Supply chain arm established in October 2020
- Quantium – Analytics firm which Woolworths owns a 75 percent stake in
- Wpay – Payments platform launched in June 2021

=== Other ===
- W23 – Venture capital arm established in April 2019

== Defunct operations ==
=== Ampol Woolworths MetroGo ===
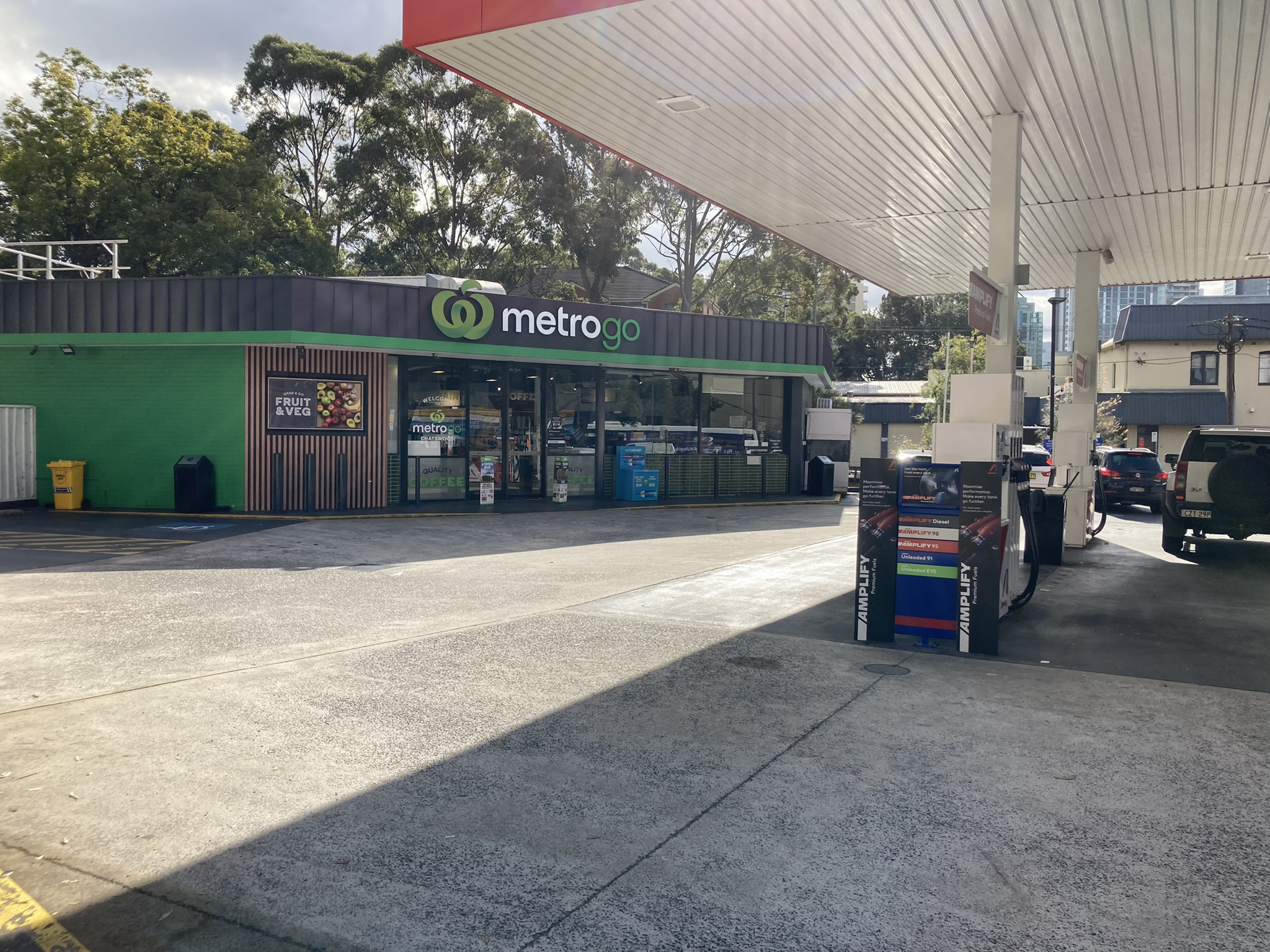
Ampol Woolworths MetroGo store in Chatswood, NSW (2022)

Ampol Woolworths MetroGo was a chain of smaller Woolworths Metro convenience stores launched in March 2022, and were found exclusively in some Ampol service stations. These stores were owned and operated by Ampol (and previously Caltex Australia), and were first launched in November 2019 as Woolworths Metro stores. The chain had over 50 stores across Australia. On 28 August 2023, it was announced in the 2023 Half Year Results that all 50 Ampol Woolworths MetroGo stores would be rebranded to Foodary.

=== Caltex Woolworths ===
Caltex Woolworths, a joint venture with Ampol (previously Caltex Australia), operated service stations across Australia. Woolworths sold the operation to the EG Group in April 2019 which has since been renamed EG Australia. Woolworths and EG entered a 15-year agreement that would maintain its fuel discount redemption across the network, and enable Woolworths Rewards points to be earned on fuel transactions across its network. The sites were rebranded to EG Ampol.

=== Caltex Safeway ===
Caltex Safeway operated service stations in Victoria until it was converted to Caltex Woolworths in 2008–2010.

=== Countdown ===
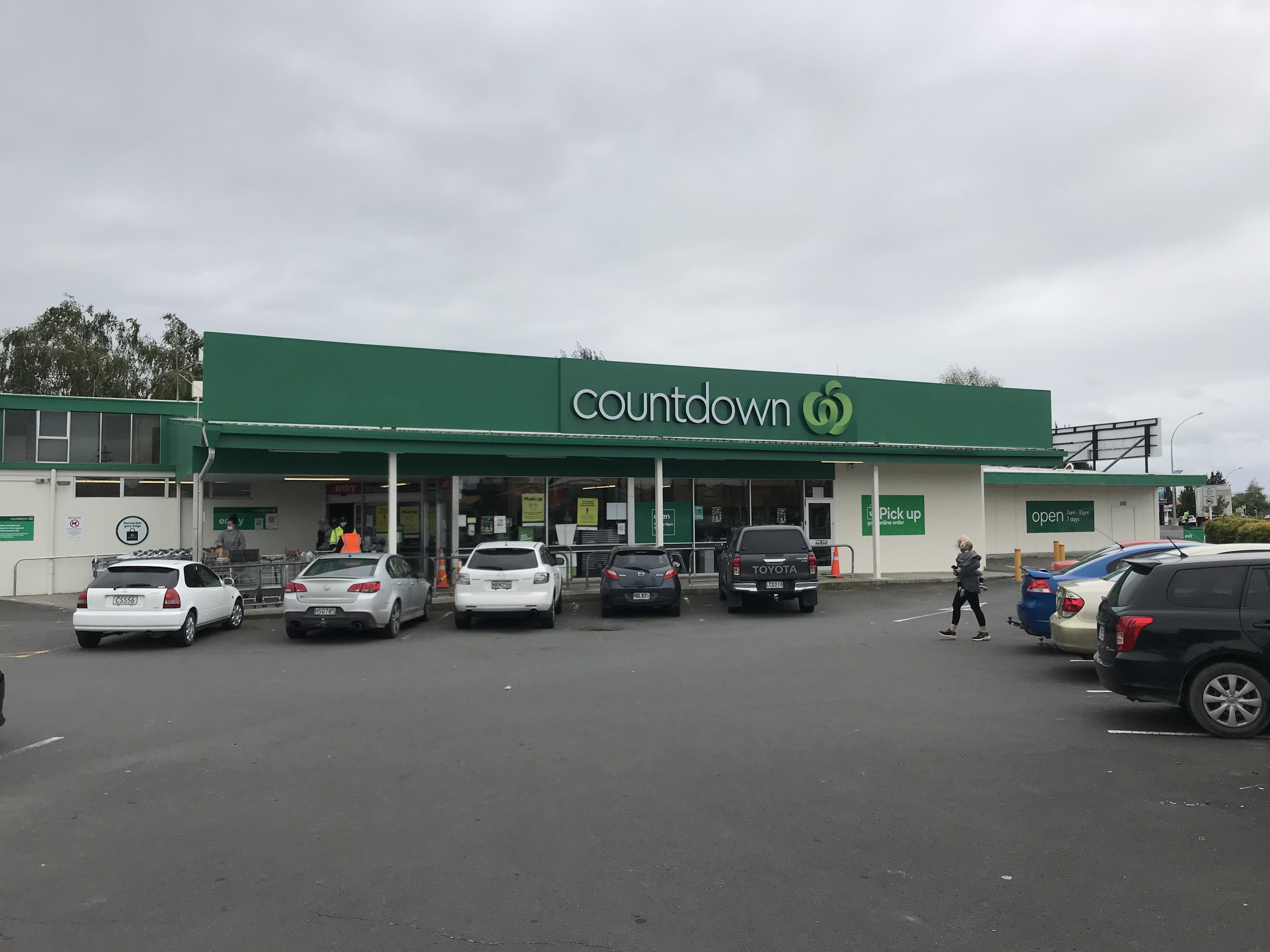
A former Countdown supermarket in Putaruru, New Zealand

On 18 July 2023, it was announced by Woolworths Group that all 194 Countdown stores will be rebranded to Woolworths from early 2024.

=== Flemings ===
Flemings was a chain of supermarkets in Sydney and the Central Coast. On 19 May 2020, the final store in Jannali closed and was replaced with a Woolworths Metro store.

=== Food for Less ===
Food For Less was a discount supermarket chain located in Queensland and New South Wales. Since 2010 stores were either closed or rebranded to Woolworths, with the last store rebranded in 2018.

=== Foodtown ===
Woolworths operated supermarket brands Foodtown and Woolworths until November 2011, which were rebranded as Countdown.

=== Macro Wholefoods Market ===
Macro Life Pty Limited
- Logo used from 2007 to 2016
- Trade name: Macro Wholefoods Market
- Type: Private
- Industry: Retail
- Founded: 1983; 43 years ago
- Defunct: 2009; 17 years ago
- Fate: Acquired by Woolworths
- Headquarters: Australia
- Number of locations: 8 stores (2009)

Macro Wholefoods Market was founded in 1983. It operated for over two decades as an independent retailer before its acquisition by Woolworths in 2009, establishing a brand reputation in the health and organic food sector. The market's retail proposition centered on providing customers with unrefined, nutritionally healthy products at affordable prices, catering to the growing consumer demand for organic and health-conscious food options.

=== Purity and Roelf Vos ===
Roelf Vos and Purity were trading names used in Tasmania prior to being rebranded as Woolworths in 2000.

=== Safeway ===
Safeway was the trading name of Woolworths for most of their Victorian stores until 2017, when the last store in Wodonga, VIC rebranded to Woolworths.

=== Safeway Liquor ===
Safeway Liquor operated liquor stores in Victoria with stores attached to its supermarkets, until it was converted to BWS in 2012–2013.

=== Thomas Dux ===
Thomas Dux was launched in 2008 in two New South Wales locations. The stores had a larger fresh food offering than traditional Woolworths stores, along with a larger delicatessen section. At its peak the chain had 11 stores. From 2014, the stores gradually closed and the chain ceased operation in late 2017. Three of the stores were retained under the "Woolworths Metro" brand; the other seven were either closed entirely or sold to other businesses. In 2021 however, the former Thomas Dux site at Black Rock, Victoria, which was retained as a "Woolworths Metro" store, was closed and is thought to be being replaced by a BWS or Dan Murphy's liquor outlet.

=== Woolworths Liquor ===
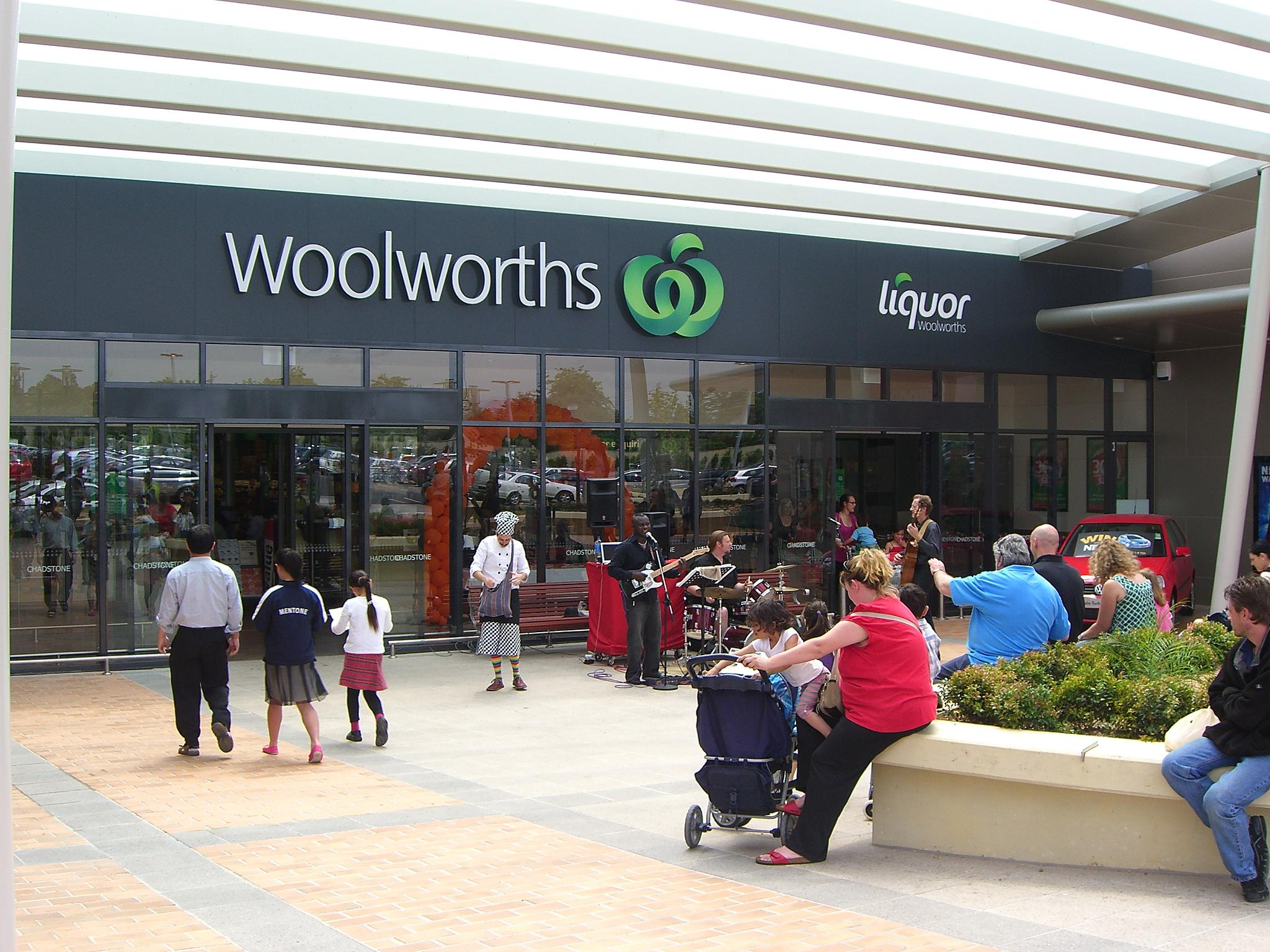
Melbourne's first newly branded Woolworths and Woolworths Liquor supermarket in Chadstone, Victoria

Woolworths Supermarket Liquor (including former Safeway Liquor in Victoria) was a liquor division of Woolworths with stores attached to its supermarkets, until all 475 stores were rebranded as BWS in 2012–2013.

== Modern slavery reporting ==
Following the introduction of Australia's Modern Slavery Act 2018, several major Australian retailers identified significant modern slavery risks within their global supply chains. Woolworths Group reported that risk assessments had identified seafood suppliers in Vietnam, cocoa suppliers in Ivory Coast, and nut suppliers in Bolivia as posing elevated risks of forced labour. The company also disclosed labour exploitation involving suppliers in Malaysia, where migrant workers from Myanmar were reimbursed recruitment fees after investigations. The disclosures formed part of the retailers' first mandatory modern slavery statements under the Act and reflected broader efforts to identify, monitor and mitigate human rights risks within international supply chains.

The Australian Government stated that its procurement policies would focus on addressing modern slavery risks in high-risk sectors, including investment, textiles, overseas construction, and cleaning and security services. Under the Modern Slavery Act 2018, Woolworths Group reported that it had addressed labour exploitation involving six suppliers in Malaysia, where migrant workers from Myanmar were reimbursed recruitment fees. The company also identified increased human rights risks associated with climate change, cotton sourced from China, and the management of the COVID-19 pandemic.
