= Woolworths (Australia) =

Australian supermarket chain

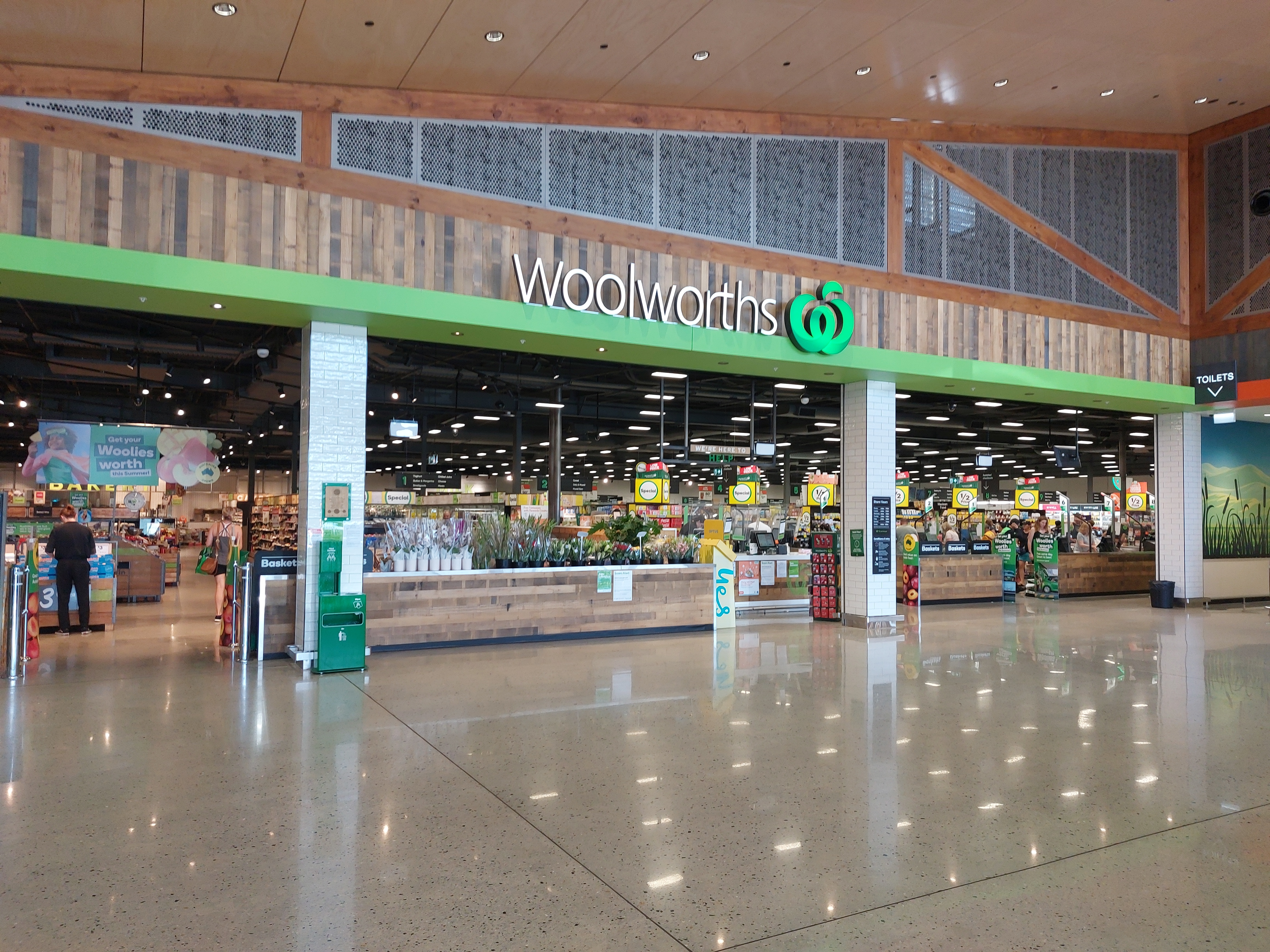
- A Woolworths store located in Balcatta, Western Australia
- Type: Subsidiary
- Industry: Retail
- Founded: 22 September 1924; 102 years ago
- Headquarters: Bella Vista, New South Wales, Australia
- Number of locations: 1,111 including metro (2024) (2022)
- Parent: Woolworths Group
- Website: www.woolworths.com.au

Woolworths is an Australian supermarket chain, a division of Woolworths Group.

Founded in 1924, Woolworths has since become one of the largest supermarket chains in Australia. The company also operates a number of Woolworths Metro convenience stores.

The company is named after the original Woolworth business in the United States, but is unrelated.

As of 2023, Woolworths is Australia's largest supermarket chain, with a market share of 32.5%. As of June 2023, there were 995 Woolworths supermarkets and 90 Woolworths Metro convenience stores.

== History ==
=== Beginnings ===
Woolworths Limited (now Woolworths Group) was first registered on 22 September 1924 by five Australian entrepreneurs – Percy Christmas, Stanley Chatterton, Cecil Scott Waine, George Creed and Ernest Williams. The first store was opened on 5 December 1924 in Pitt Street of Sydney's Imperial Arcade, called "Woolworths Stupendous Bargain Basement". Following the first store there were only 29 shareholders and there was little interest to accelerate the brand's growth. However, as trading continued and shareholders brought more capital, the dividends paid by the company increased from 5% to 50% after its third year of operation. Consumer interest in the company grew after December 1924, as more branches of the store were established across Australia. Woolworths stores began selling a variety of goods, claiming the lowest prices as well as money back guarantees. At the forefront of retail innovation in Australia, Woolworths stores became the first variety store in the world to install receipt printing cash register machines in 1926. The second Woolworths outlet was opened on 6 August 1927, on Queen Street, Brisbane. Following the opening of the Hobart store in 1940, Woolworths had a store in every state in Australia.

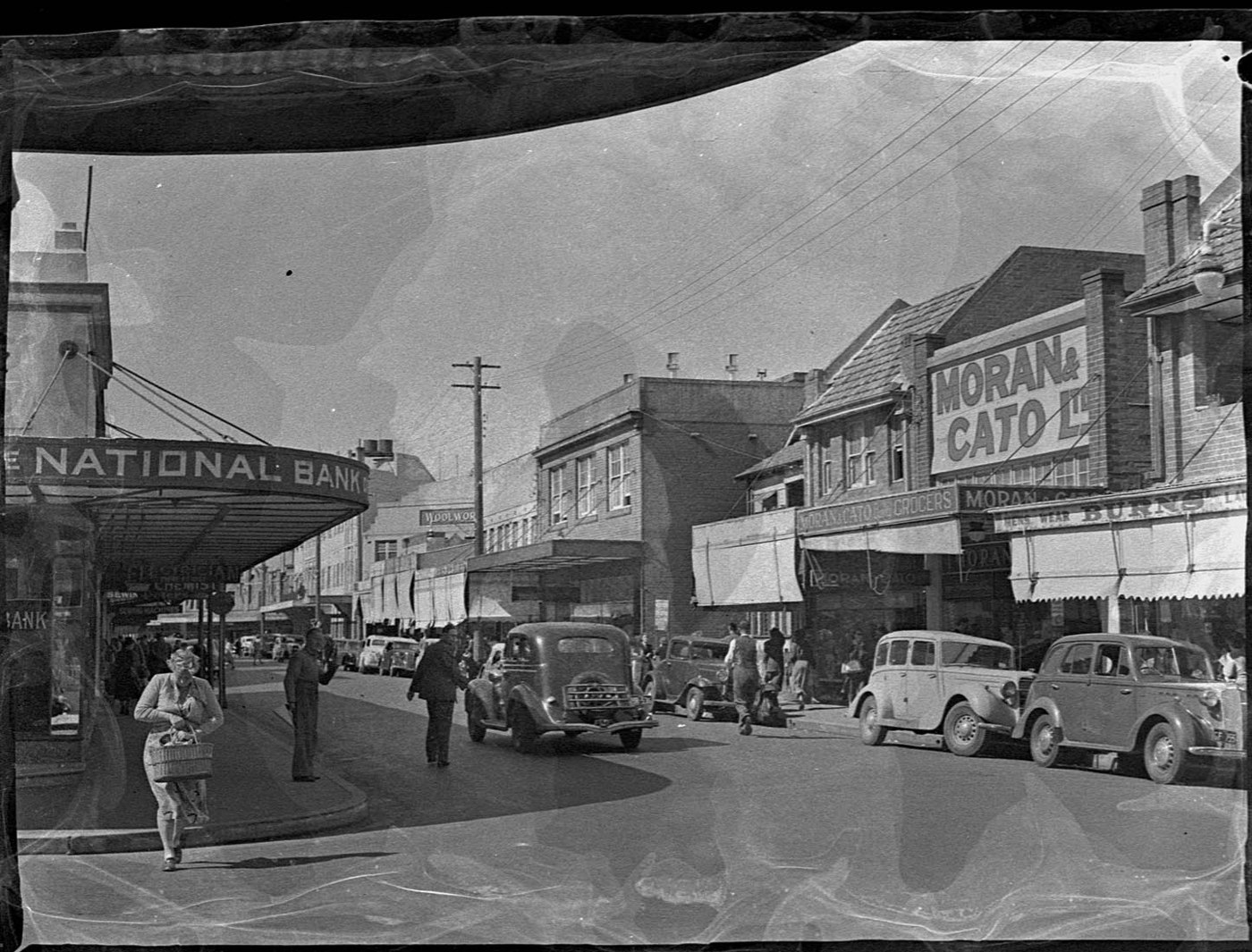
A Woolworths store in 1951 on Sydney Road, Manly

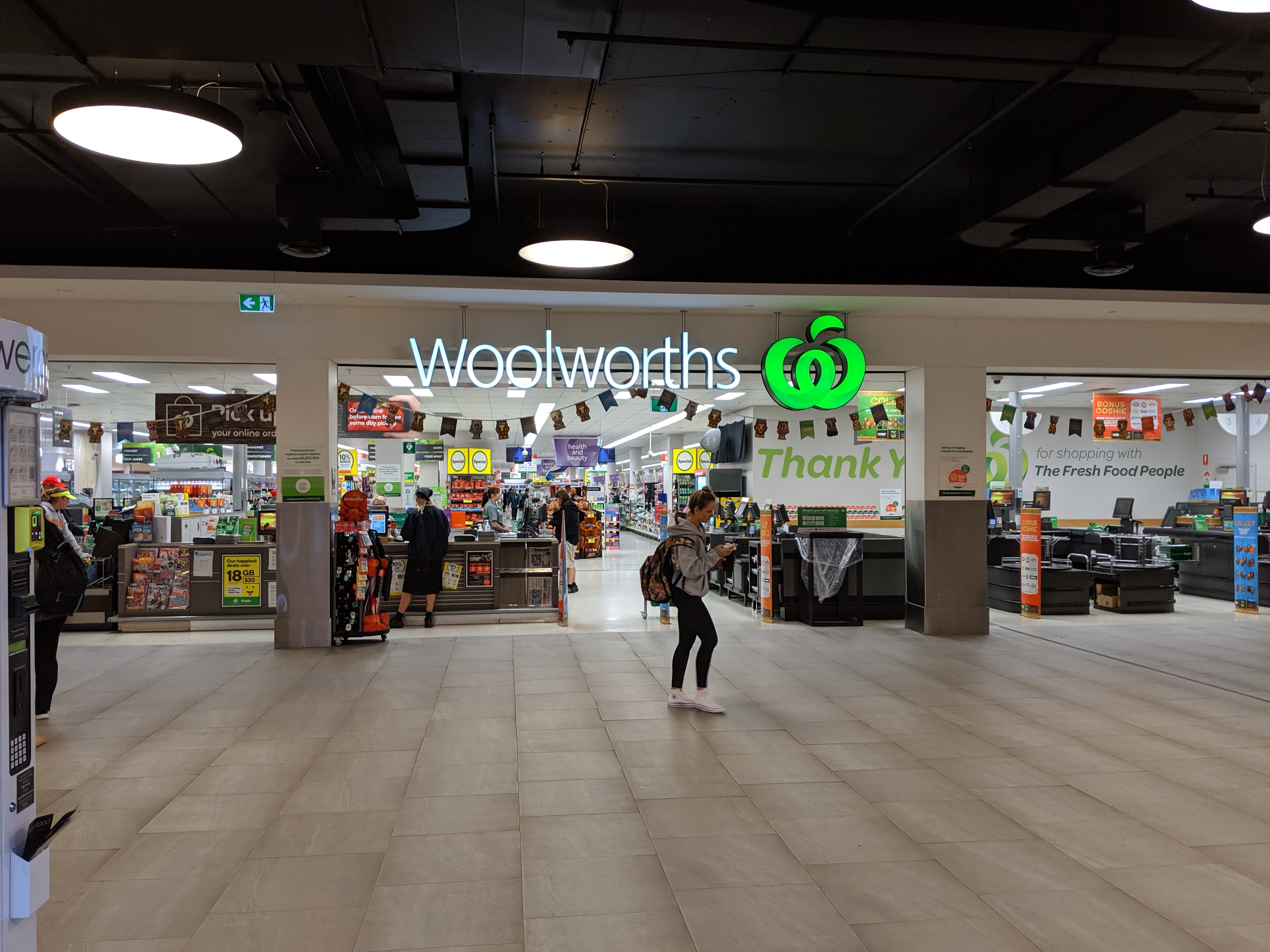
Woolworths supermarket in Coolangatta, Queensland

With the company and its stores running successfully, Woolworths began to experiment with expanding their grocery range – more stores began stocking fresh fruits and vegetables and a larger range of food. The first self-service store in Beverly Hills, Sydney was opened in 1955. In 1958 the first supermarket was opened at Dee Why, followed by the first purpose-built supermarket at Warrawong Plaza in 1960. This site closed in 2012, but reopened in 2024. In 1958 Woolworths Limited acquired all 32 Brisbane Cash & Carry stores, which was a popular Brisbane grocery store chain. These were then later rebranded as Woolworths stores. As Woolworths gradually focused more on groceries, the first Big W department store was opened in 1964 at Jesmond, New South Wales.

=== Acquisition of Safeway and other expansion ===
In 1982, Woolworths Limited acquired two Tasmanian grocery brands: Roelf Vos and Purity, which were converted into Woolworths stores in 2000. After the arrival of American supermarket giant Safeway in Australia in 1962, Safeway Australia was bought by Woolworths in 1985. Woolworths Limited acquired all of the Safeway stores and the naming rights in exchange for a 20% equity interest in Woolworths Limited.

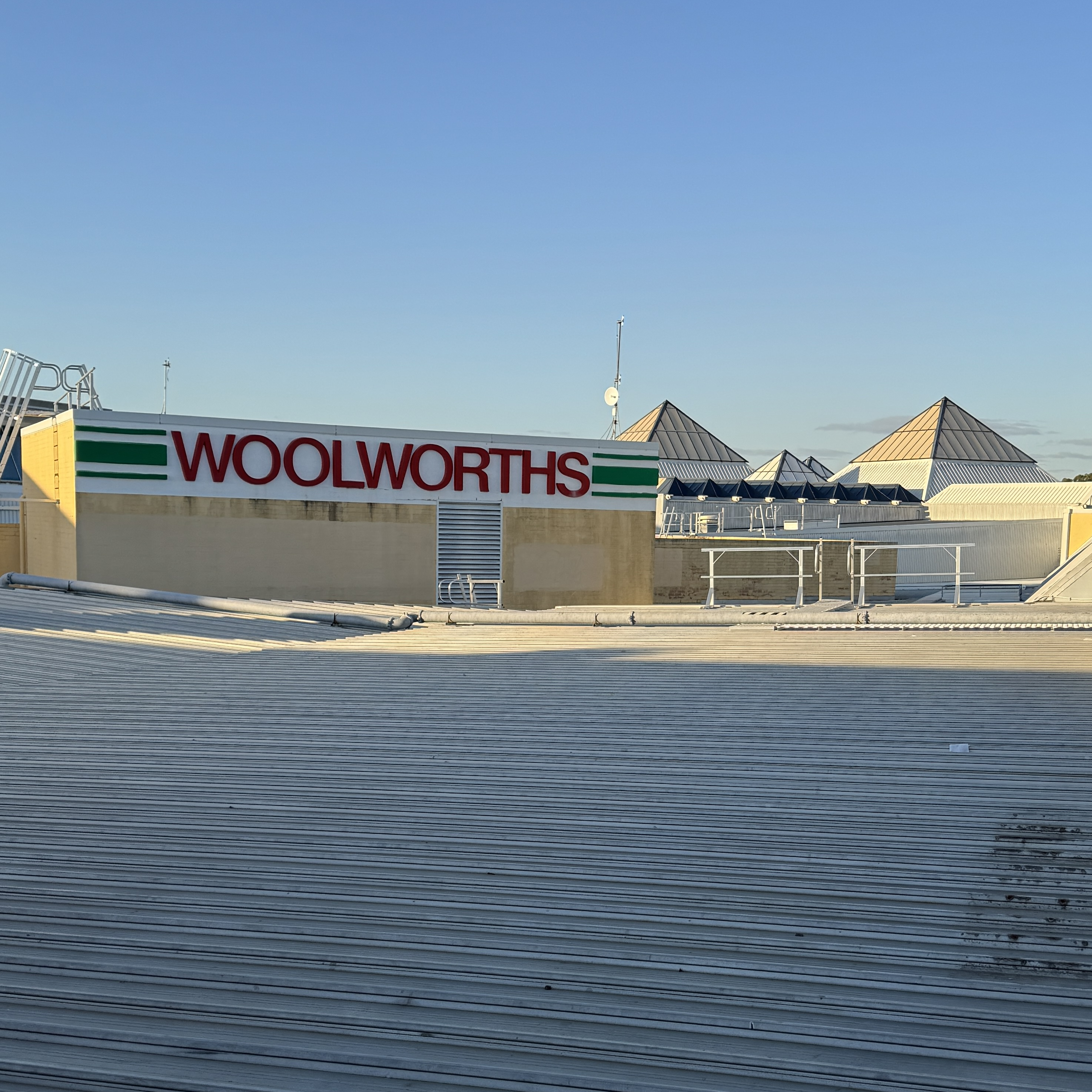
Whitford City has a 1990's era Woolworths sign atop the original Woolworths store (now part of the main mall) visible from the uppermost rooftop carpark.

In 1987, Woolworths launched the "Fresh Food People" campaign after implementing new company protocols for their fresh food departments.

In 2007, Woolworths announced that it was planning to launch a general purpose credit card in 2008. Woolworths offered these credit card holders reward vouchers redeemable throughout its store network. Woolworths subsequently announced that the Woolworths Everyday Money MasterCard would be launched on 26 August 2008, allowing customers to earn shopping cards redeemable at Woolworths Group retailers.

At the time of the acquisition, Safeway had 126 stores across Victoria, Queensland and New South Wales. All Safeway stores in Queensland and New South Wales were rebranded as Woolworths supermarkets, but most Victorian stores continued trading as Safeway. In 2008, Woolworths announced it would rebrand Safeway stores as Woolworths, and this process was completed in June 2017. This was when Safeway Wodonga was closed and rebuilt as a Woolworths, ending the company of Safeway.

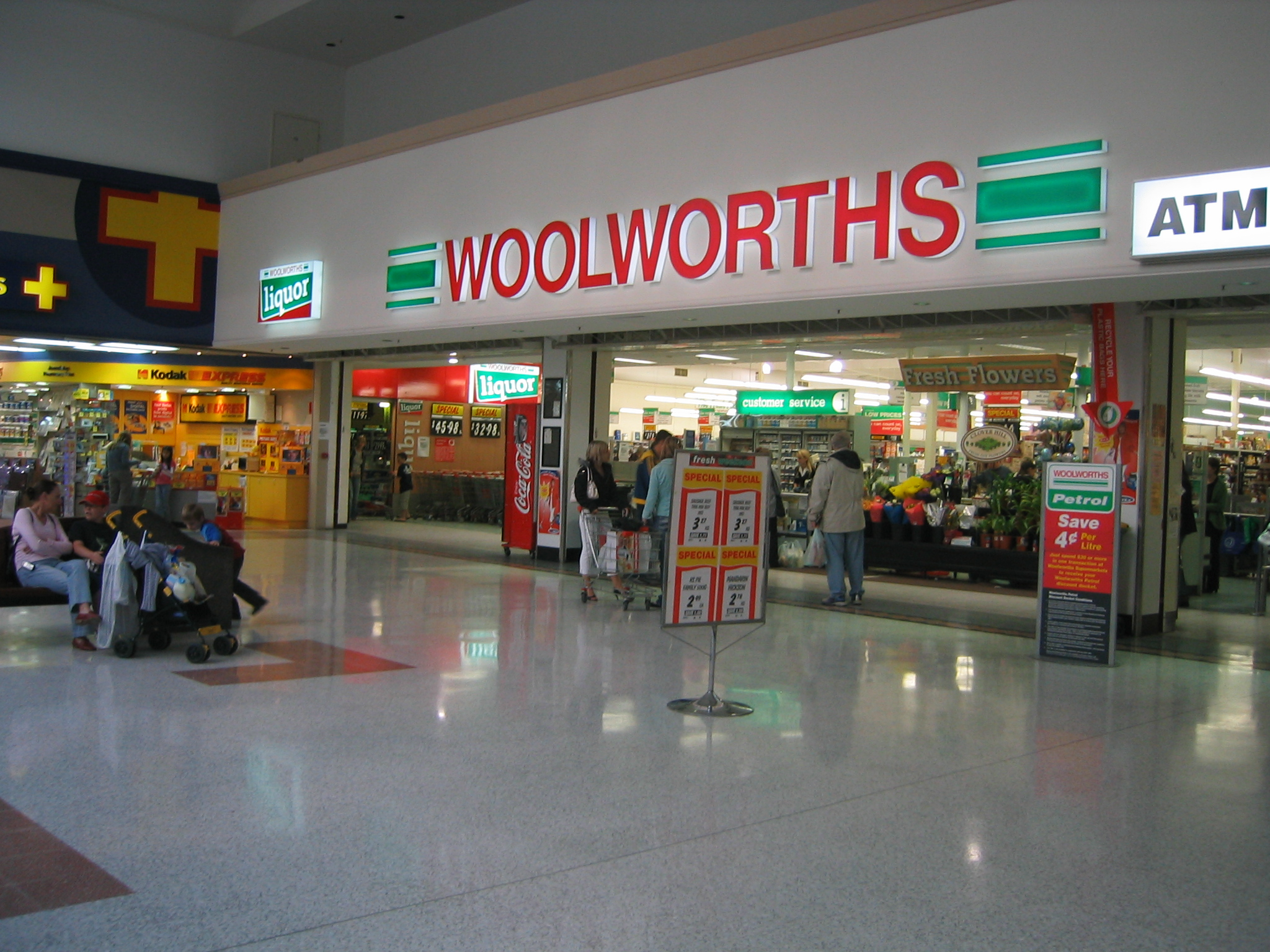
Woolworths supermarket at Lakeside Joondalup

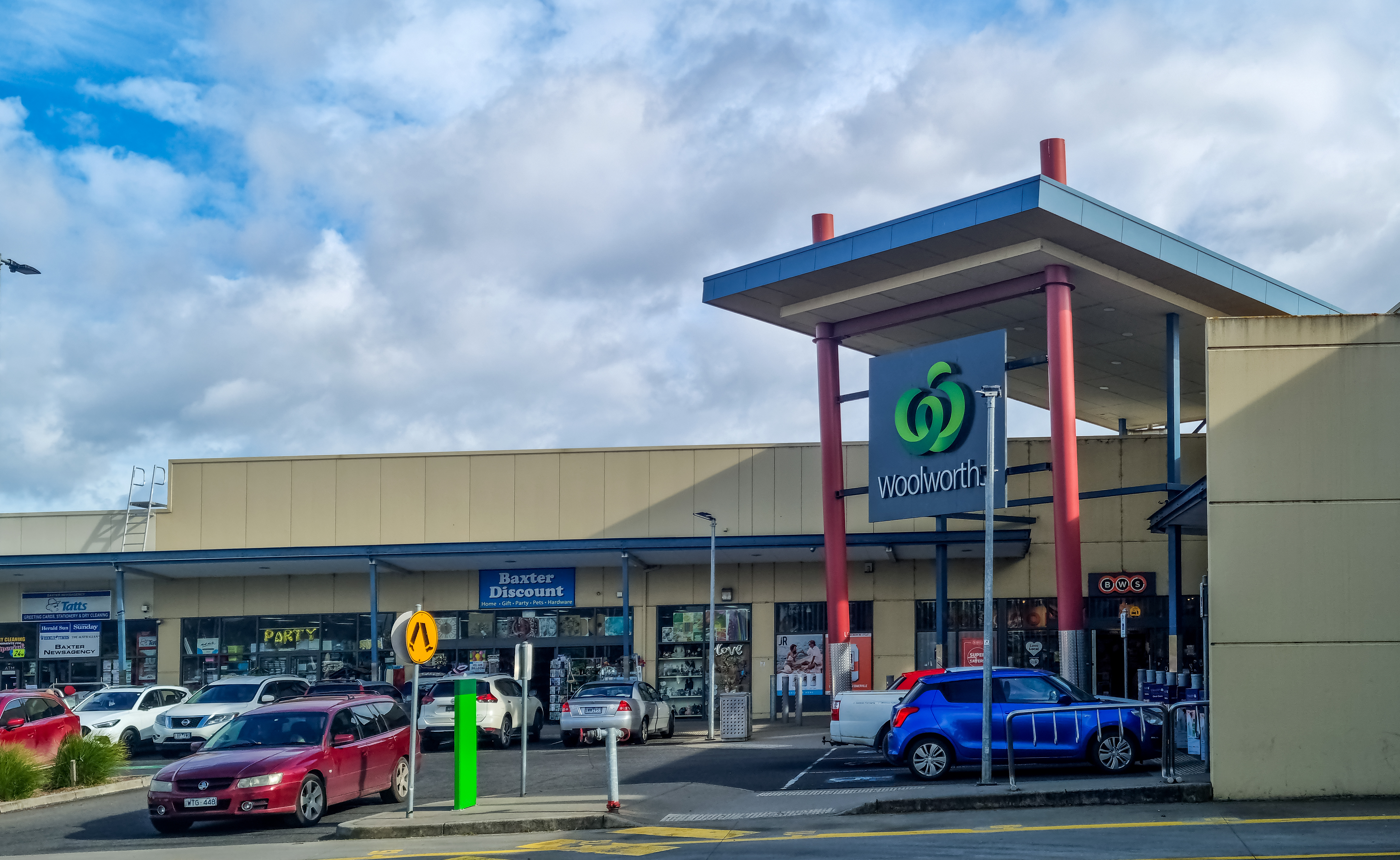
Woolworths store in Baxter, Victoria

=== Current store formats ===
==== Woolworths ====
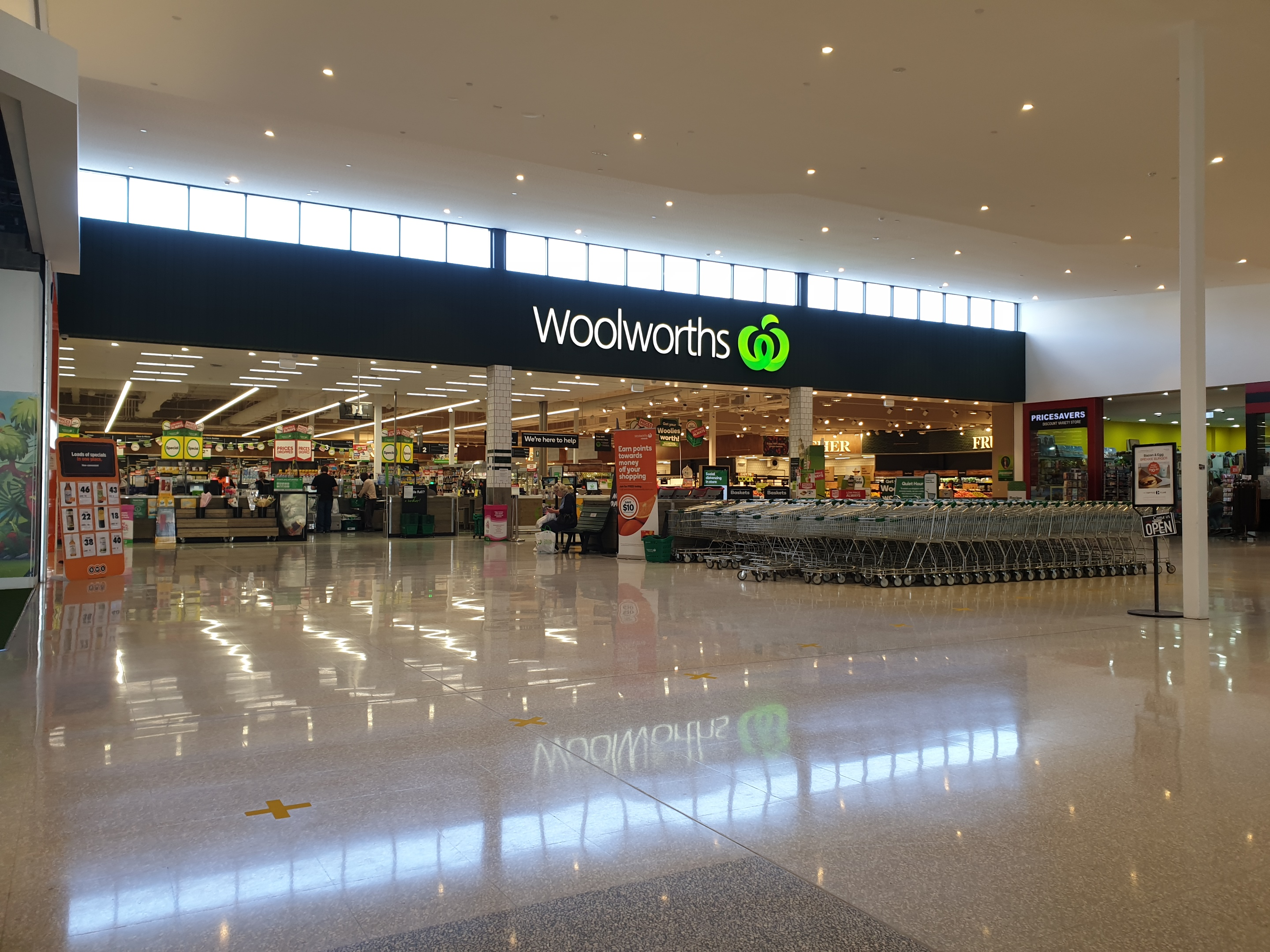
A Woolworths store in a shopping centre in Butler, Western Australia

This is the standard supermarket format.

==== Woolworths New Zealand ====
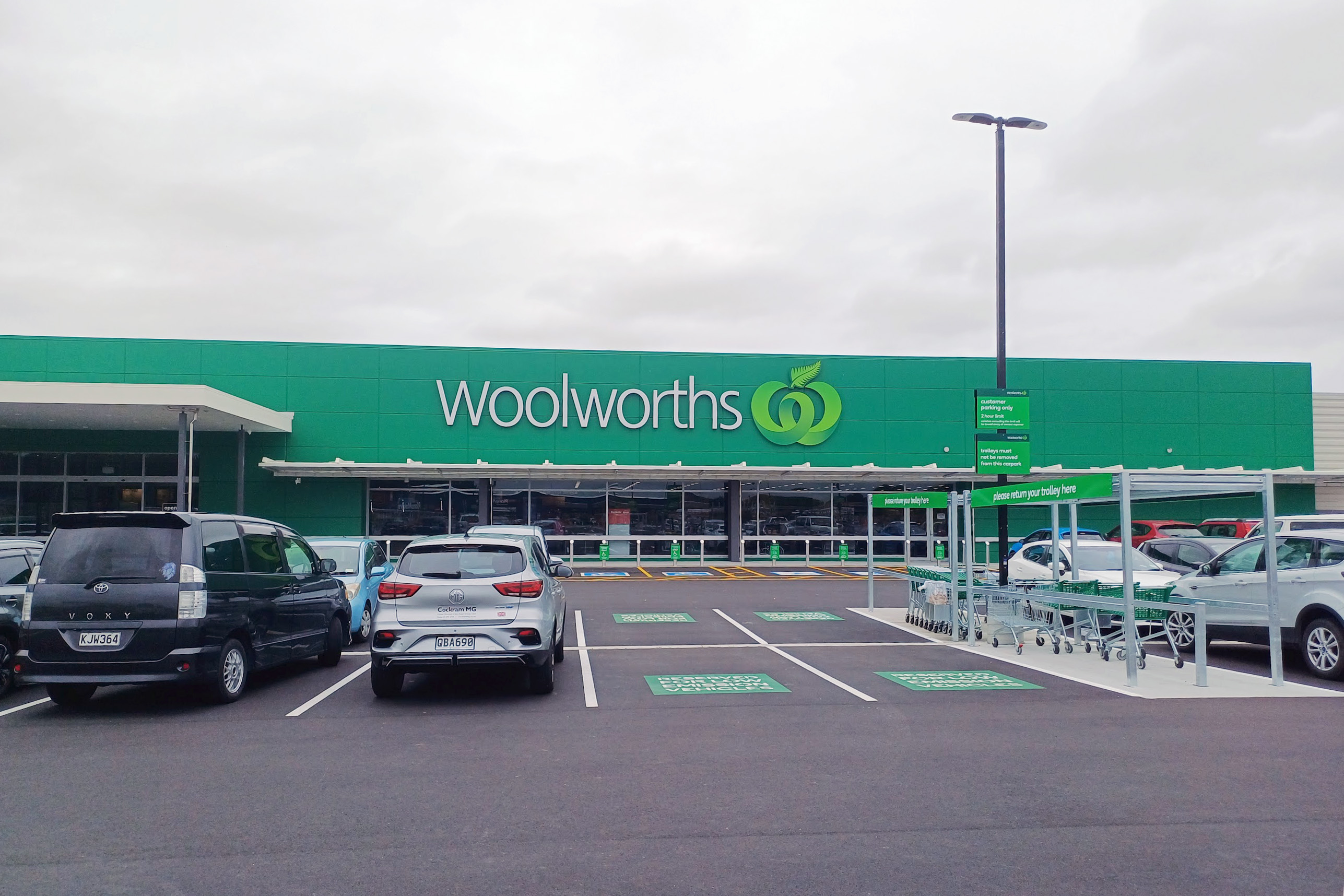
A Woolworths store in Kaiapoi, New Zealand

Woolworths NZ is the trading name in New Zealand. Woolworths also operated supermarket brands Foodtown and Woolworths until November 2011, which were rebranded as Countdown.

==== Woolworths Metro ====
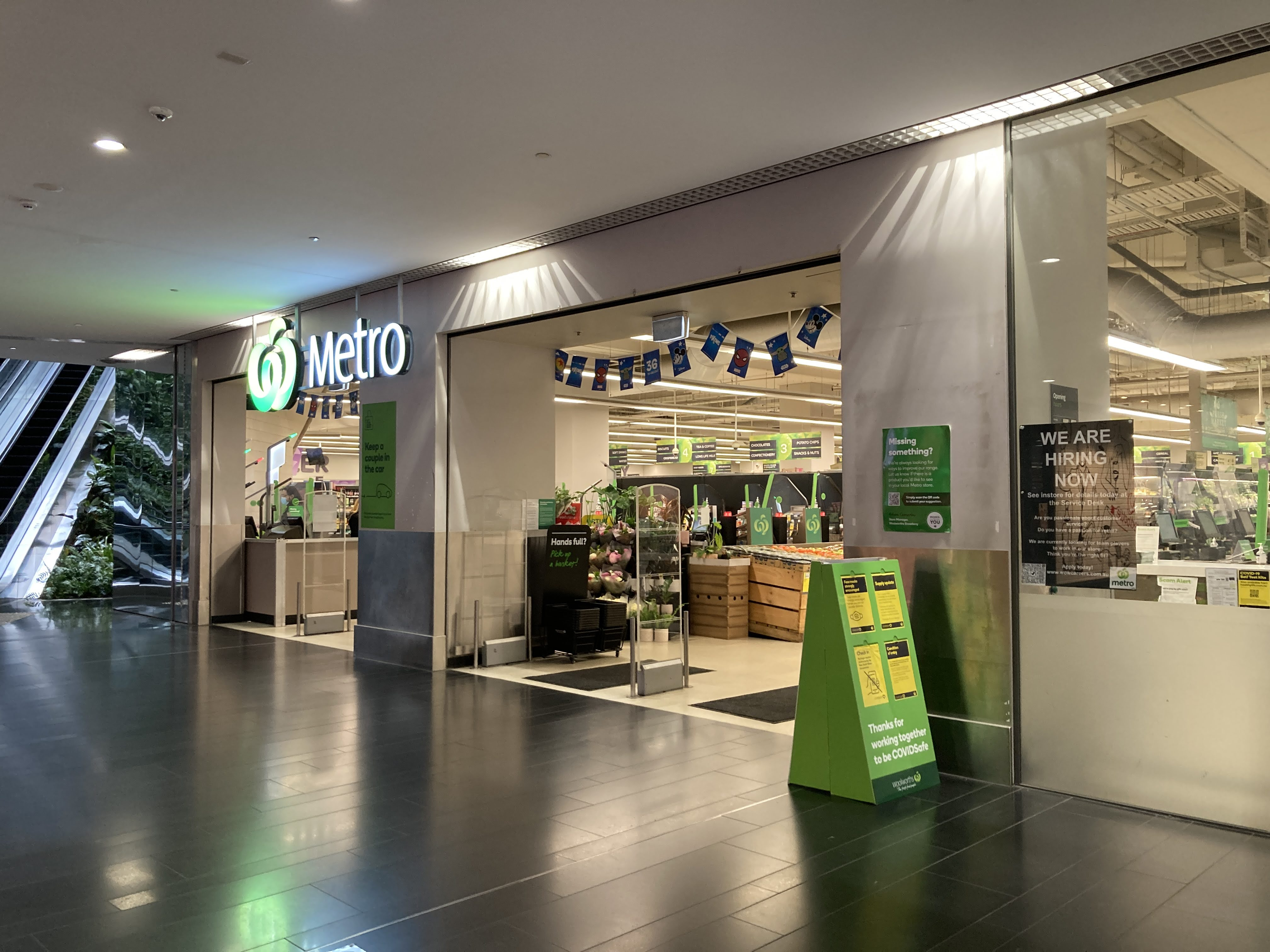
A Woolworths Metro store in Sydney

Woolworths Metro is a chain of small format grocery stores launched in 2013. The first store opened in Sydney, and the chain now has over 90 stores across Australia as of August 2023. Three of them are former Thomas Dux stores, while others are mostly placed within central business districts.

=== Defunct store formats ===
==== Ampol Woolworths MetroGo ====
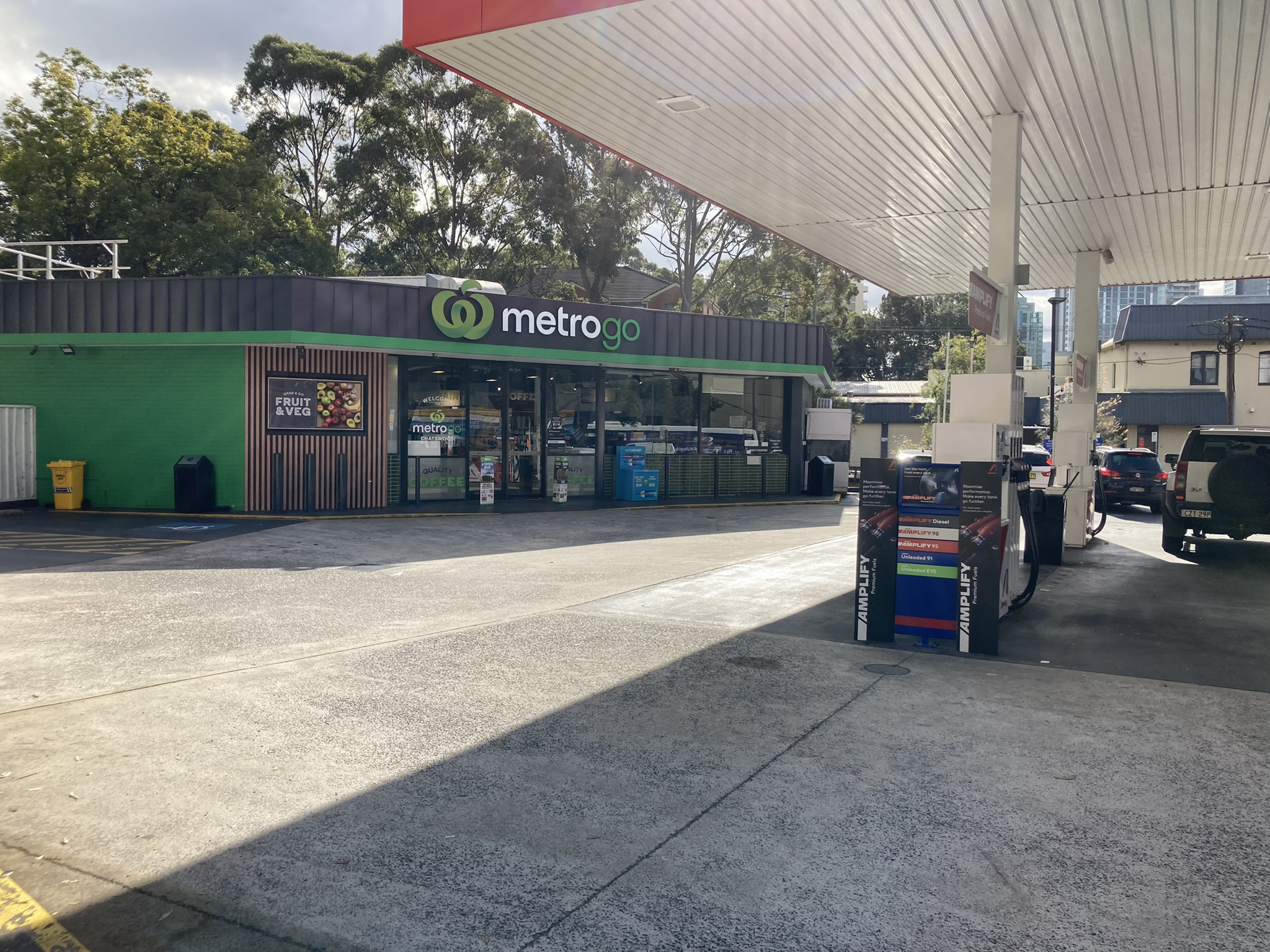
Ampol Woolworths MetroGo store in Chatswood, NSW (2022)

Ampol Woolworths MetroGo was a chain of smaller Woolworths Metro convenience stores launched in March 2022, and were found exclusively in some Ampol service stations. These stores were owned and operated by Ampol (and previously Caltex Australia), and were first launched in November 2019 as Woolworths Metro stores. The chain had over 50 stores across Australia. On 28 August 2023, it was announced in the 2023 Half Year Results that all 50 Ampol Woolworths MetroGo stores would be rebranded to Foodary.

==== Caltex Woolworths ====
Caltex Woolworths, a joint venture with Ampol (previously Caltex Australia), operated service stations across Australia. Woolworths sold the operation to the EG Group in April 2019 which has since been renamed EG Australia. Woolworths and EG entered a 15-year agreement that would maintain its fuel discount redemption across the network, and enable Woolworths Rewards points to be earned on fuel transactions across its network. The sites were rebranded to EG Ampol.

==== Caltex Safeway ====
Caltex Safeway operated service stations in Victoria until it was converted to Caltex Woolworths in 2008–2010.

==== Countdown ====
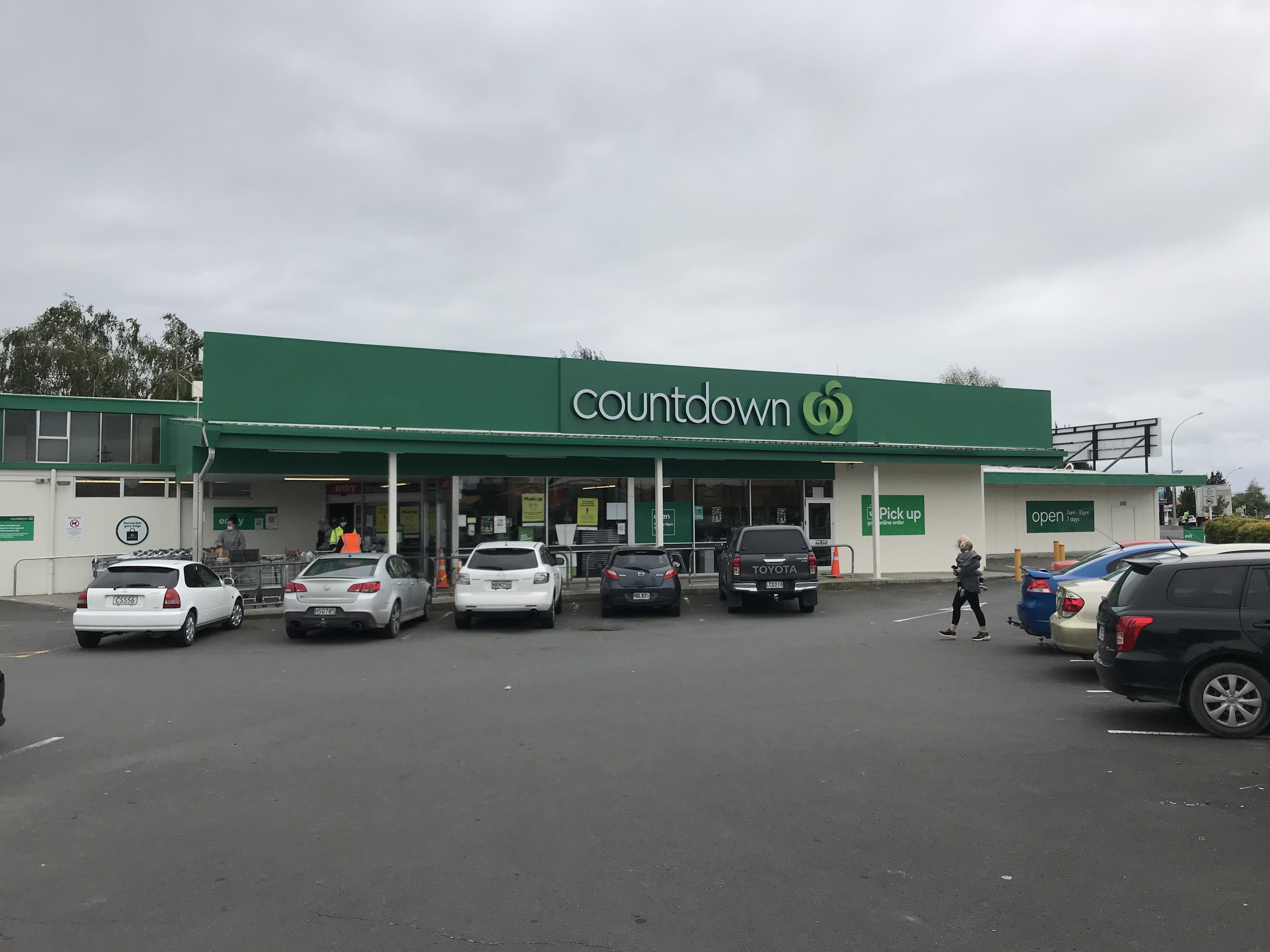
A former Countdown supermarket in Putaruru, New Zealand

On 18 July 2023, it was announced by Woolworths Group that all 194 Countdown stores will be rebranded to Woolworths from early 2024.

==== Flemings ====
Flemings was a chain of supermarkets in Sydney and the Central Coast. On 19 May 2020, the final store in Jannali closed and was replaced with a Woolworths Metro store.

==== Food for Less ====
Food For Less was a discount supermarket chain located in Queensland and New South Wales. Since 2010 stores were either closed or rebranded to Woolworths, with the last store rebranded in 2018.

==== Foodtown ====
Woolworths operated supermarket brands Foodtown and Woolworths until November 2011, which were rebranded as Countdown.

==== Macro Wholefoods market ====
Macro Wholefoods market
- Logo used from 2007 to 2016
- Type: Subsidiary

==== Purity and Roelf Vos ====
Roelf Vos and Purity were trading names used in Tasmania prior to being rebranded as Woolworths in 2000.

==== Safeway ====
Safeway was the trading name of Woolworths for most of their Victorian stores until 2017, when the last store in Wodonga, VIC rebranded to Woolworths.

==== Safeway Liquor ====
Safeway Liquor operated liquor stores in Victoria with stores attached to its supermarkets, until it was converted to BWS in 2012–2013.

==== Thomas Dux ====
Thomas Dux was launched in 2008 in two New South Wales locations. The stores had a larger fresh food offering than traditional Woolworths stores, along with a larger delicatessen section. At its peak the chain had 11 stores. From 2014, the stores gradually closed and the chain ceased operation in late 2017. Three of the stores were retained under the "Woolworths Metro" brand; the other seven were either closed entirely or sold to other businesses. In 2021 however, the former Thomas Dux site at Black Rock, Victoria, which was retained as a "Woolworths Metro" store, was closed and is thought to be being replaced by a BWS or Dan Murphy's liquor outlet.

==== Woolworths Liquor ====
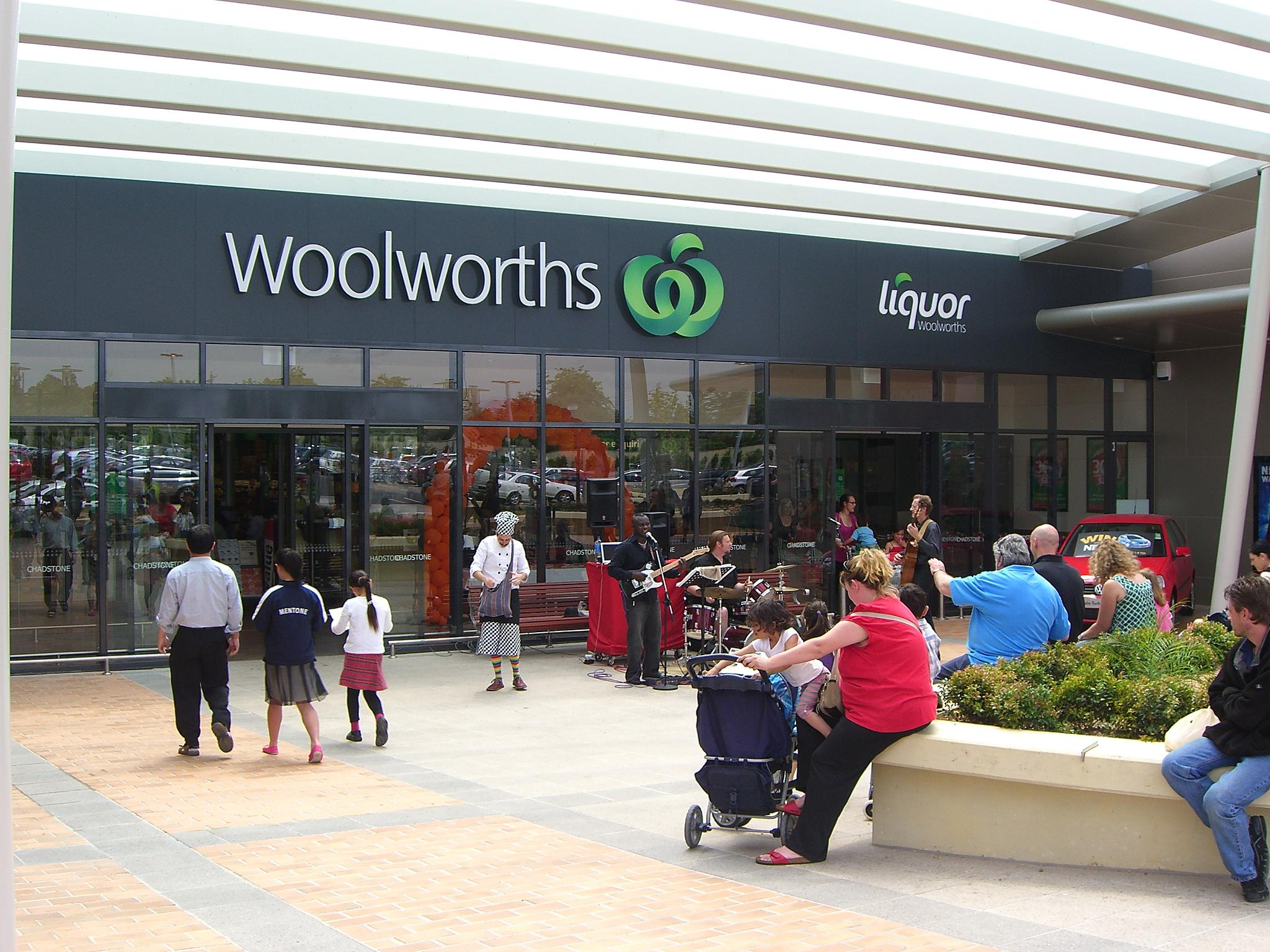
Melbourne's first newly branded Woolworths and Woolworths Liquor supermarket in Chadstone, Victoria

Woolworths Supermarket Liquor (including former Safeway Liquor in Victoria) was a liquor division of Woolworths with stores attached to its supermarkets, until all 475 stores were rebranded as BWS in 2012–2013.

=== Further developments ===
The company's slogan changed slightly in 2012 to "Australia's Fresh Food People" to promote the fact that 96% of fresh produce sold in Woolworths supermarkets is grown in Australia. In 2014 the original "The Fresh Food People" slogan returned with a new lineup of television commercials. Various other catchphrases have been used in recent advertisements, including "That's Today's Fresh Food People", and "Get Your Woolies Worth."

In 2018, Woolworths Group stopped providing single-use plastic bags during checkout at the same time as Coles Supermarkets, bringing them in line with Australia's third-biggest supermarket, Aldi. In the following three months, Australian's plastic bag use dropped by 80%, leading to 1.5 billion fewer bags going to landfill. Woolworths also committed to removing 180 tonnes of plastic packaging from their products in 2018.

In 2019, Woolworths admitted to having underpaid 5,700 of its employees by up to 300 million dollars from 2010 to 2019.

In July 2020, Woolworths were found guilty of breaching spam laws in excess of 5 million times and failing to unsubscribe customers from their mailing lists when requested to do so. The Australian Communications & Media Authority (ACMA) found Woolworths had unlawfully spammed more than a million customers between October 2018 and July 2019. The supermarket was found to have repeatedly ignored consumers who had tried to prevent receipt of marketing emails and had not attempted to improve, despite the ACMA notifying the company that they had received customer complaints. The company was fined $1,003,800.

ACMA chairman Nerida O'Loughlin said of the violation: "The spam rules have been in place for 17 years and Woolworths is a large and sophisticated organisation. The scale and prolonged nature of the non-compliance is inexcusable."

In 2021, Woolworths and ARN launched Woolworths Radio which is powered by iHeartRadio. It plays in stores but also can be available to listen out of Woolworths Stores. It serves as a direct competitor to Coles Radio.

In September 2021, Woolworths launched an online marketplace called Everyday Market. The marketplace allows customers to purchase products from partnered companies, including products not normally sold in the supermarket.

In 2023, Woolworths announced the credit card offering would be discontinued at the end of their 8-year partnership with Macquarie Bank.

In May 2023, Woolworths acquired Milkrun, a fast grocery delivery startup which ceased operations the previous month and competed with the supermarket's Metro60 delivery service. Woolworths rebranded Metro60 as Milkrun.

In 2023, Woolworths came under scrutiny for converting some of its full-size stores into the smaller Woolworths Metro format stores. Woolworths Metro stores typically stock a lesser range of products and have a different pricing structure than the full format stores. In August 2023, residents in Alexandria protested the planned conversion of their local Woolworths to a Woolworths Metro. A petition, promoted by local community groups, gathered over 1600 signatures, with support from the City of Sydney mayor, Clover Moore. Despite the community feedback, Woolworths pushed through with the Metro conversion.

=== 2020s inflation period ===
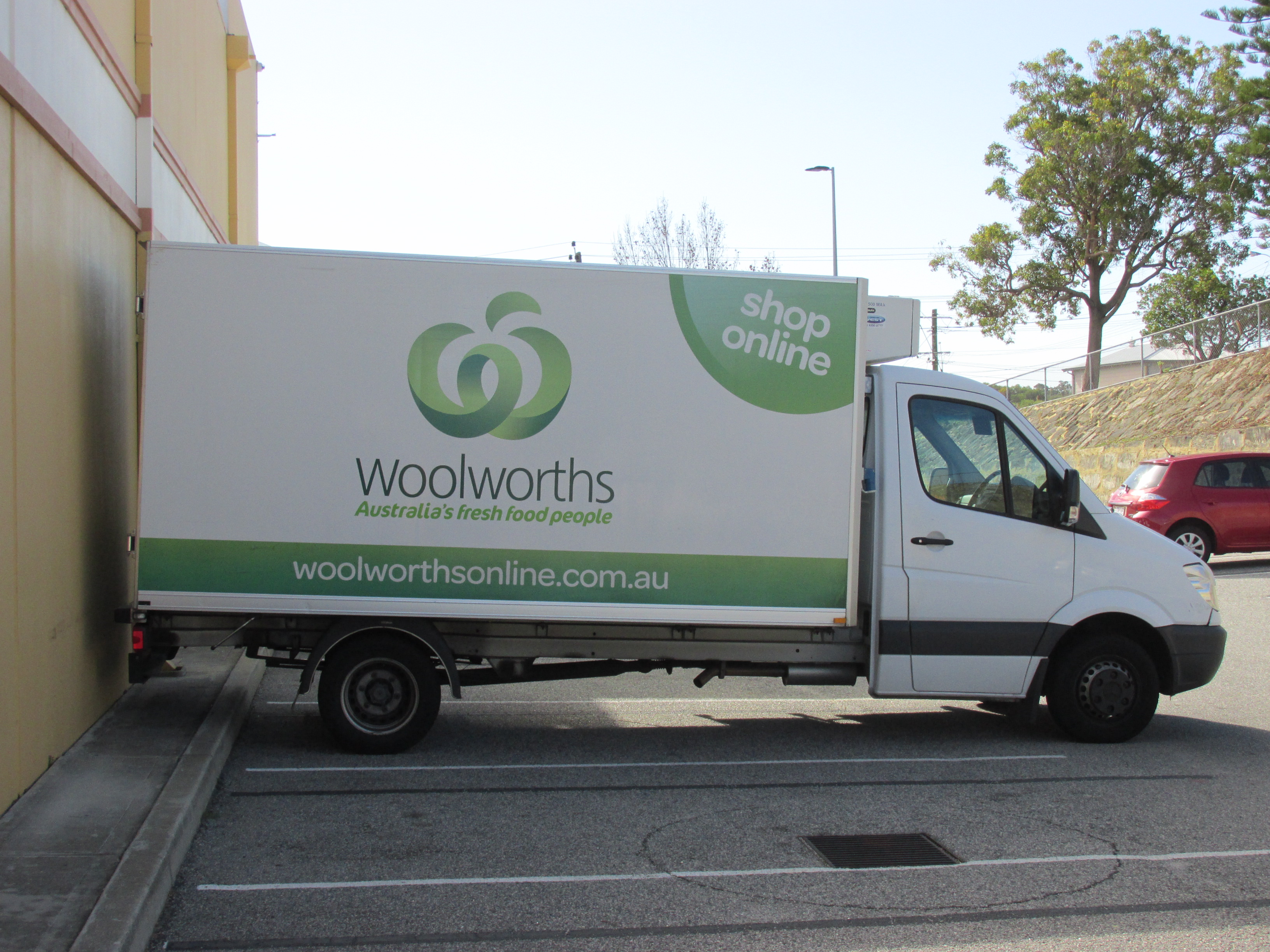
A Woolworths vehicle parked in Westminster, Western Australia.

Both Woolworths and Coles Supermarkets have come under scrutiny in 2023–2025 due to their alleged collaboration in price gouging. The Australian supermarket sector has long been one of the most concentrated in the world. Research from 2012 outlines how Coles and Woolworths' dominance weakens incentives to lower consumer prices, while increasing their bargaining power over suppliers. Together, the two form a duopoly and duopsony in the Australian supermarket industry colloquially known as Colesworth. The supermarket chain claims that price increases are an ongoing effect of the global 2021–2023 inflation.

CEO Brad Banducci was interviewed on the news program Four Corners in February 2024 and subsequently walked out mid interview, but later returned after being coaxed into returning to complete the interview. He subsequently announced his intention to resign from the position in September of that year with the managing director of e-commerce and loyalty, Amanda Bardwell replacing him as CEO.

In April 2024, Woolworths admitted to underpaying staff by $1.24 million in long service leave entitlements between November 2018 and January 2023. More than a thousand employees in Victoria were affected, and Wage Inspectorate Victoria fined Woolworths $1.263 million.

In September 2024, the Australian Competition and Consumer Commission (ACCC) brought legal action against Woolworths, accusing the supermarket of misleading customers on discounts through their Prices Dropped promotions. The ACCC claimed that prices under the promotion were subjected to sequential price rises of at least 15 percent for brief periods. It is also alleged that 266 products over a 20 month period were affected by the misconduct committed by the supermarket giant.

Woolworths has committed to phasing out battery cages from its supply chains, and to end the sale of caged eggs by the end of 2025. Progress toward this goal has been reported, with own‑brand whole shell eggs already fully cage free and 89% of vendor‑brand whole shell eggs sourced from cage‑free systems as of July 2025. In September 2025, Woolworths did not meet its cage‑free egg commitment, citing industry supply challenges amid avian flu outbreaks. The company did not announce a revised deadline, and animal welfare groups called on it to uphold the original 2025 target.

== See also ==
- List of supermarket chains in Oceania
