= Pacific Bondi Beach =

- Location: Bondi Beach, New South Wales, Australia
- Coordinates: 33°53′20″S 151°16′33″E
- Address: 180 Campbell Parade
- Opened: 1980 (Swiss Grand Hotel); 2015 (Pacific Bondi Beach)
- Manager: Capitel Group
- Owner: Capitel Group
- Num. of stores: 24
- Num. of anchor tenants: 1
- Floor area: 7,241 m^{2} (77,940 sq ft)
- Floors: 7
- Parking: 150 spaces
- Website: www.pacificbondibeach.com.au

Pacific Bondi Beach is an indoor/outdoor shopping centre in the suburb of Bondi Beach in the Eastern Suburbs of Sydney, Australia.

== Transport ==
Pacific Bondi Beach has Transdev John Holland bus connections to the Eastern Suburbs, as well as local surrounding suburbs

Pacific Bondi Beach has a car park with 150 spaces.

== History ==
Originally called the Swiss Grand Hotel, the building opened in the 1980s on Campbell Parade, opposite of the beach. The building was built upon the site of an old service station that had been abandoned. The Swiss Grand Hotel featured 13 stores and was the first site of where Bondi Pizza was founded in 2009.

In 2007, for an undisclosed sum, the building and management was bought, planning for future development on the site—once construction began in 2013, 13 stores closed at the shopping centre. The Swiss Grand Hotel was demolished for the as of present Pacific Bondi Beach. This construction was completed in 2015, with a new QT Hotel that introduced 69 rooms and 112 residential apartments.

Saturdays Surf NYC opened their first Australian flagship store in the building on 21 November 2015. Woolsworths Metro, BWS and the other retailers housed inside of Pacific Bondi Beach opened in early 2016.

On 27 July 2016, Pacific Bondi Beach won the Urban Taskforce Award for Development of the Year for 2016.
