= Bondi Beach =

- Suburb
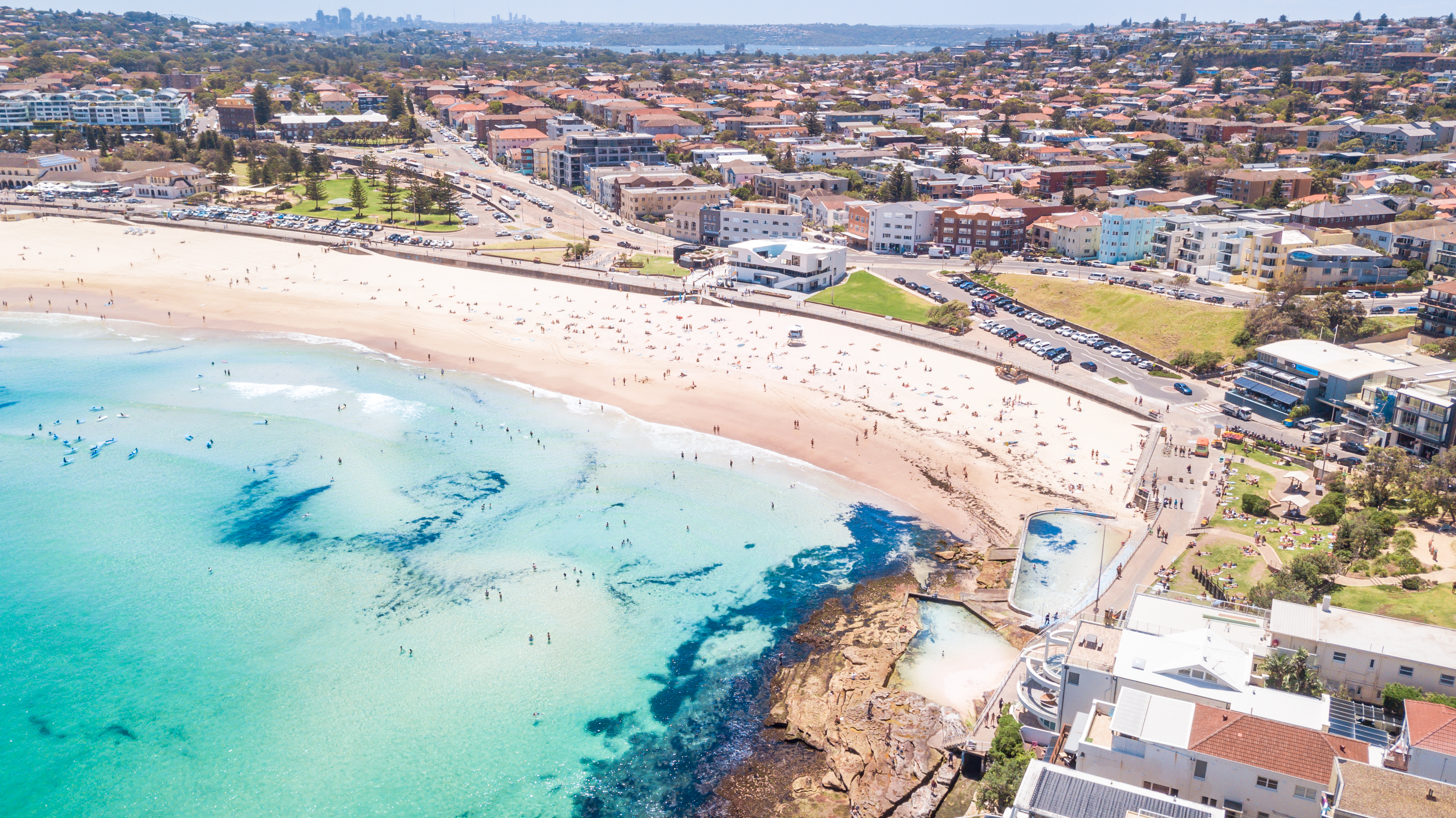
- Aerial view of Bondi Beach

- Interactive map of Bondi Beach
- Coordinates: 33°53′28″S 151°16′27″E
- Country: Australia
- State: New South Wales
- City: Sydney
- LGA: Waverley Council
- Location: 7 km (4.3 mi) E of Sydney CBD
- Established: 1851

Government
  - State electorate: Vaucluse
  - Federal division: Wentworth

Area
  - Total: 1.22 km^{2} (0.47 sq mi)
- Elevation: 21 m (69 ft)

Population
  - Total: 11,513 (SAL 2021)
- Postcode: 2026
Suburbs around Bondi Beach
Bellevue Hill	Rose Bay	North Bondi
Bondi Junction	Bondi Beach	Tasman Sea
Bondi	Tamarama	Tasman Sea

Bondi Beach (/ˈbɒndaɪ/ BON-dy) is a beach and the surrounding suburb in Sydney, New South Wales, Australia. Bondi Beach is located 7 kilometres (4 miles) east of the Sydney central business district, in the local government area of Waverley Council, in the Eastern Suburbs. In the 2021 Australian census it had a population of 11,513 residents. Its postcode is 2026. Bondi, North Bondi and Bondi Junction are neighbouring suburbs. Bondi Beach is one of the most visited tourist sites in Australia, and the location of two television series, Bondi Rescue and Bondi Vet.

== Toponymy ==
The name "Bondi" is derived from the Dharawal language, spoken by the Aboriginal clans who lived further from Sydney Harbour southwards to Shoalhaven. The word Bondi, also spelt Bundi, Bundye, and Boondye, originates from the word for a loud thud, such as the sound of waves breaking over rocks, but is also associated with nulla nulla, or fighting sticks, which make a loud noise when they hit something. The first record of bondi by European-ancestry Australians was made between 1899 and 1903.

== History ==
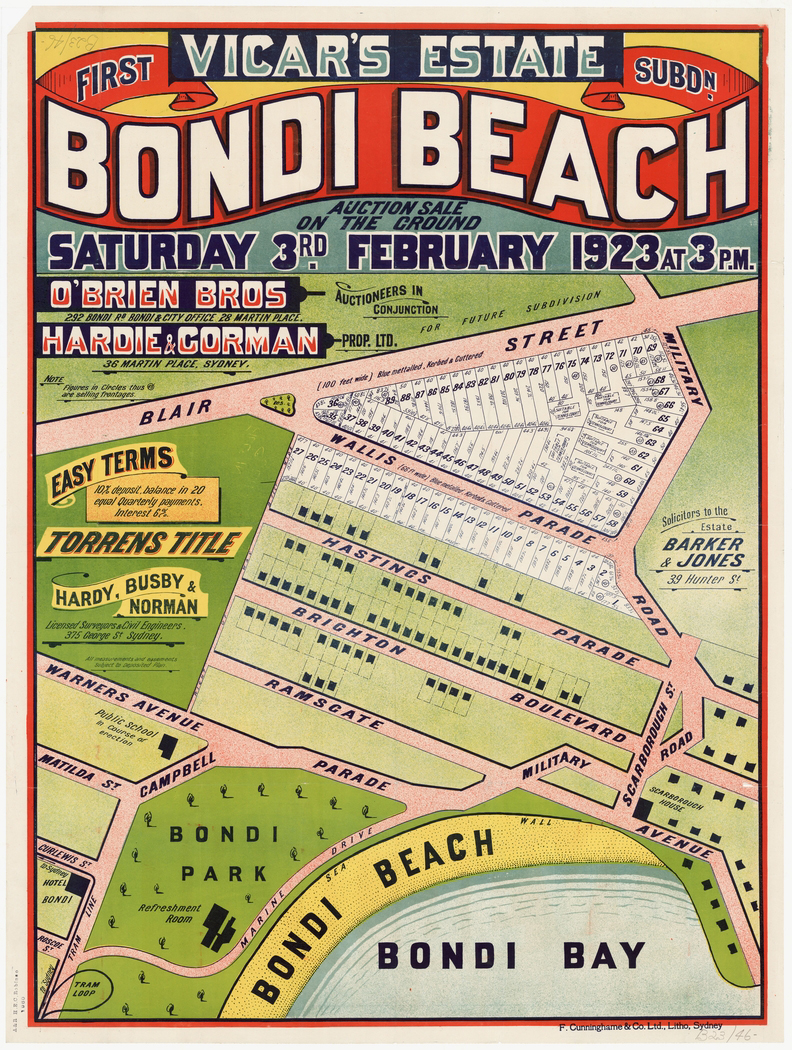
Bondi Beach, Vicar's Estate Auction, 1923, subdivision plan

Before the arrival of Europeans in the Port Jackson area, the Waverley and Bondi areas were inhabited for tens of thousands of years by Aboriginal Australian peoples, who left evidence of their habitation in the form of paths, rock carvings, artefacts, and shelters. The eastern beaches were home to the Bidjigal, Birrabirragal, and Gadigal people.

=== 19th and 20th centuries ===
In 1809, the road builder William Roberts received a grant of land in the area. In 1851 Edward Smith Hall and Francis O'Brien purchased 200 acres (0.8 square kilometres) of the Bondi area that included most of the beach frontage, which was named "The Bondi Estate". Hall was O'Brien's father-in-law. Between 1855 and 1877 O'Brien purchased his father-in-law's share of the land, renamed the land the "O'Brien Estate," and made the beach and the surrounding land available to the public as a picnic ground and amusement resort. As the beach became increasingly popular, O'Brien threatened to stop public beach access. However, the Municipal Council believed that the Government needed to intervene to make the beach a public reserve. In mid-1882, Bondi Beach became a public beach. The first tramway to the beach was established in 1884. The Waverley Council was responsible for building the first surf bathing sheds on the beach in 1903. By 1929 an estimated 60,000 people were visiting the beach on a summer weekend day. The opening of the pavilion in the same year attracted a huge crowd of 200,000.

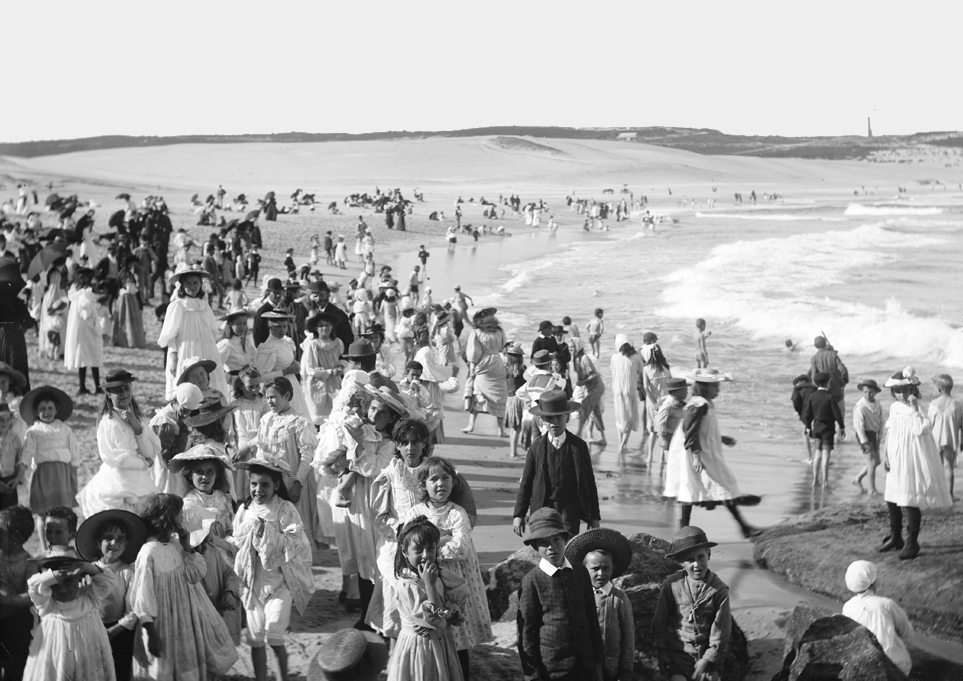
'Bondi Bay' – a photo from c. 1900 from The Powerhouse Museum

On 6 February 1938, five people drowned and over 250 people were rescued or resuscitated after a series of large waves struck the beach and pulled people wading on a sandbank into the sea, a day that became known as "Black Sunday".

Bondi Beach was a working-class suburb throughout most of the twentieth century with migrant people from New Zealand comprising the majority of the local population. Following World War II, Bondi Beach, and the Eastern Suburbs became home to Jewish migrants from Poland, Russia, Hungary, Czechoslovakia, and Germany. A stream of Jewish immigration continued into the 21st century and the area has some synagogues and a kosher butcher. The multicultural migration funded and drove the growth of the suburb throughout the 1990s into the turn of the century, moving it steadily from its working-class roots towards an upper/middle-class enclave similar to its neighbours of Rose Bay and Bellevue Hill which was listed as the most expensive postcode in the country from 2003 to 2005.

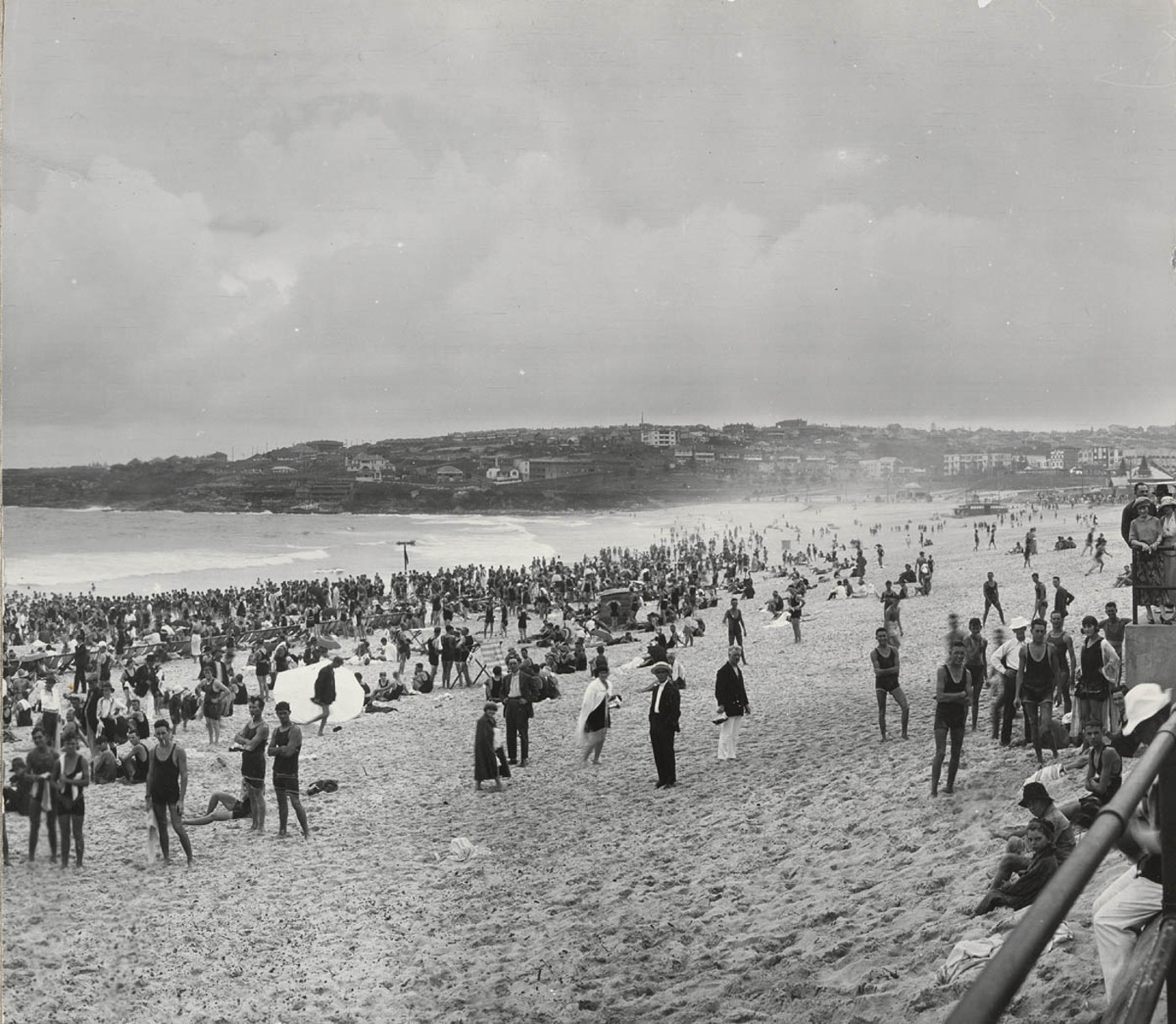
Activity on Bondi Beach in 1922

Bondi Beach was long a centre for efforts to fight indecency in beach attire. The beach was a focal point of the 1907 Sydney bathing costume protests, organised to oppose proposed dress standards for beachgoers. The Local Government Act, Ordinance No. 52 (1935) governed the decency of swimming costumes and was in force between 1935 and 1961, which resulted in public controversy as the two-piece "bikini" became popular after World War II. Waverley Council's beach inspectors, including Aubrey Laidlaw, were responsible for enforcing the law and were required to measure the dimensions of swimwear and order offenders against public decency off the beach. While vacationing in Australia in 1951, American movie actress Jean Parker made international headlines when she was escorted off the beach after Laidlaw determined her bikini was too skimpy. The rule became increasingly anachronistic during the 1950s and was replaced in 1961 with one requiring bathers be "clad in a proper and adequate bathing costume", allowing for more subjective judgment of decency. By the 1980s topless bathing had become common at Bondi Beach, especially at the southern end.

Sydney's Water Board maintained an untreated sewage outlet not far from the north end of the beach until the 1960s when a sewage treatment plant was built. In the mid-1990s the plant was upgraded and a deepwater ocean outfall was completed to meet water quality standards.

=== 21st century ===
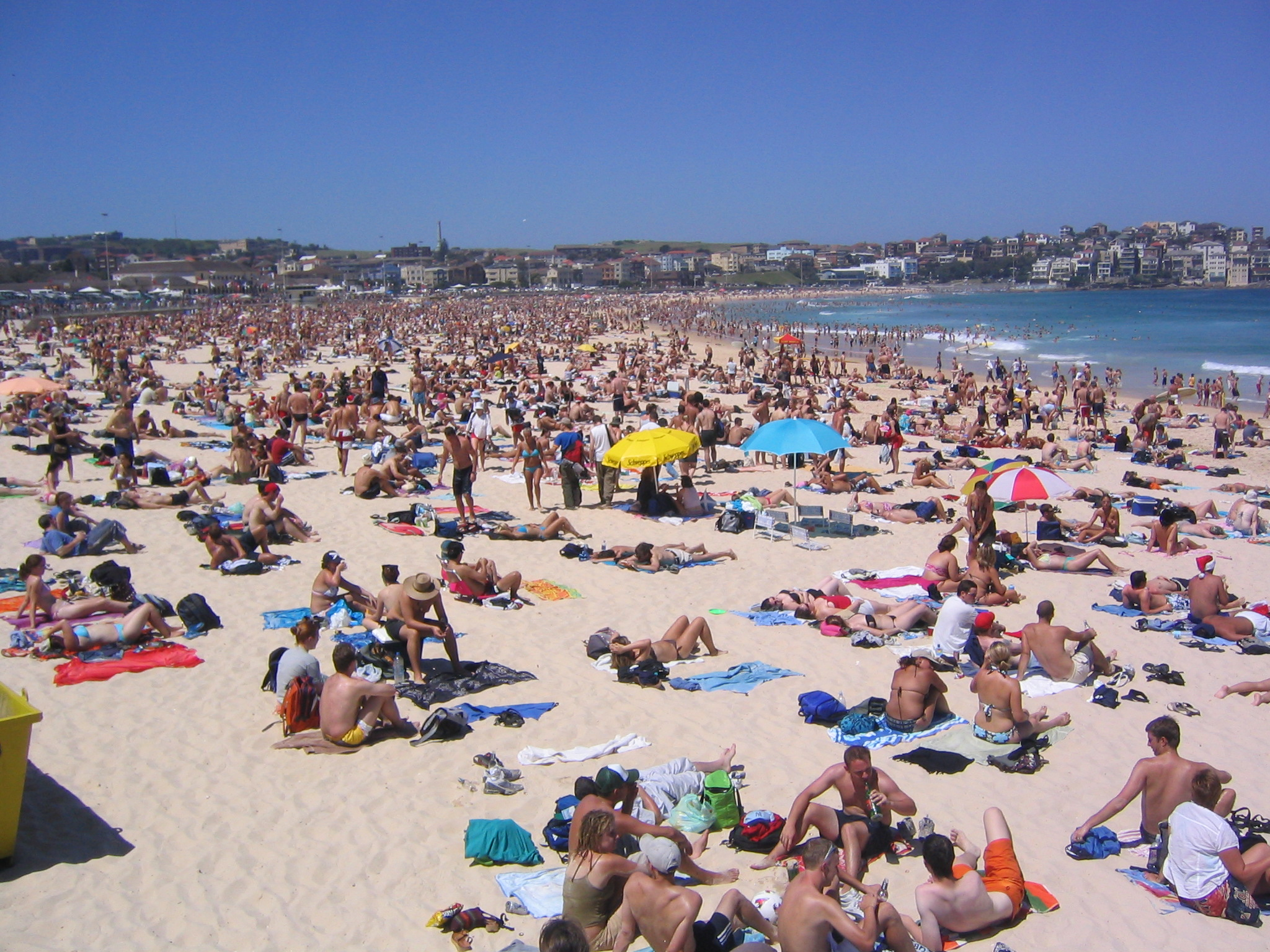
View of Bondi Beach in 2003

In March 2007, Waverley Council started proceedings to evict a hermit who was living in squalor on a cliff overlooking the beach. Peter James Paul Millhouse, calling himself Jhyimy "Two Hats" Mhiyles, came to the beach during the 2000 Sydney Olympic Games and became a local celebrity for his lifestyle and poetry recitals to visitors. Residents and tourists put together a "save the caveman" petition to allow him to continue residing but under certain rules. In 2009, he was arrested and charged with the rape of a tourist. While he was in custody, Waverley Council under then-mayor Liberal Sally Betts removed his belongings from the cliff. In September 2011, charges against Jhyimy were dropped by the Director of Public Prosecutions over concerns about the reliability of the witness. Waverley Council has not offered recompense for his eviction from his home or loss of belongings.

In March 2020, the Government of New South Wales closed Bondi Beach after several people there exceeded Australia's outdoor-gathering limit imposed to slow the spread of the coronavirus in New South Wales.

=== 2025 mass shooting ===
On 14 December 2025, an antisemitic and Islamic State (IS)–inspired terrorist attack occurred at the Archer Park area of Bondi Beach, during a celebration of the Jewish holiday of Hanukkah attended by around 1,000 people. A father and son duo allegedly shot dead 15 people, whose ages ranged from 10 to 87, and wounded 40 others. The father was killed by police and the son was taken into custody in critical condition.

Over the course of the attack, six civilians confronted and attempted to stop the gunmen. Three were killed and two suffered gunshot wounds.

The Bondi Beach shooting is the first fatal attack on Jews in Australia, the worst terrorist attack in Australia, and the deadliest mass shooting in Australia since the 1996 Port Arthur massacre.

== Heritage listings ==
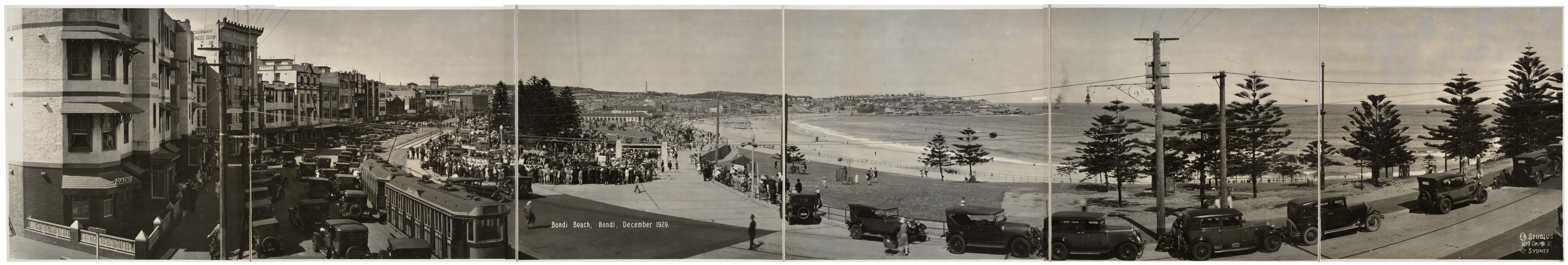
Crowds at Bondi Beach, Sydney, December 1929

Bondi Beach has several heritage-listed sites, including:

- 20 Hall Street: Bondi Beach Post Office
- Queen Elizabeth Drive: Bondi Beach Cultural Landscape

Bondi Beach was added to the Australian National Heritage List on the 25th of January 2008.

== Beach features ==
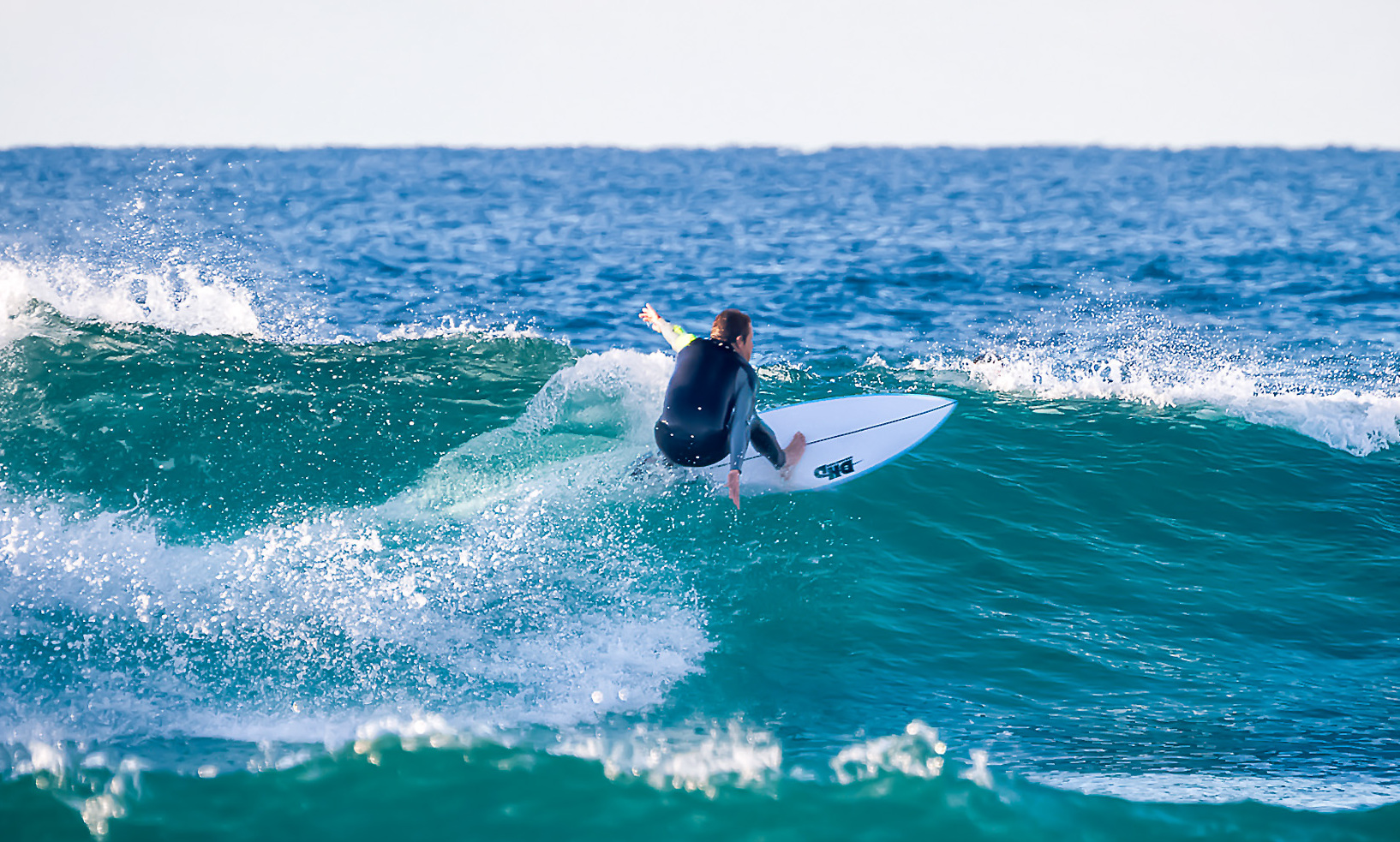
Winter surfer at Bondi

Bondi Beach is the northernmost ocean beach to the south of Port Jackson and also the closest one to the Sydney CBD. It is about 1 kilometre (0.6 mi) long and—untypically for beaches in Sydney—it faces south. The northern end of the beach is sheltered by a headland known as Ben Buckler Point, which is the beginning of a line of sea cliffs extending to South Head.

The beach receives many visitors throughout the year. Surf Life Saving Australia gave different hazard ratings to areas of Bondi Beach in 2004. While the northern end has been rated a gentle 4 (with 10 as the most hazardous), the southern side is rated as a 7 due to a famous rip current known as the "Backpackers' Rip" because of its proximity to the bus stop. Many backpackers and tourists do not realise that the flat, smooth water is a dangerous rip current, and tourists can be unwilling to walk the length of the beach for safer swimming. The south end of the beach is generally reserved for surfboard riding. Yellow and red flags define safe swimming areas, and visitors are advised to swim between them.

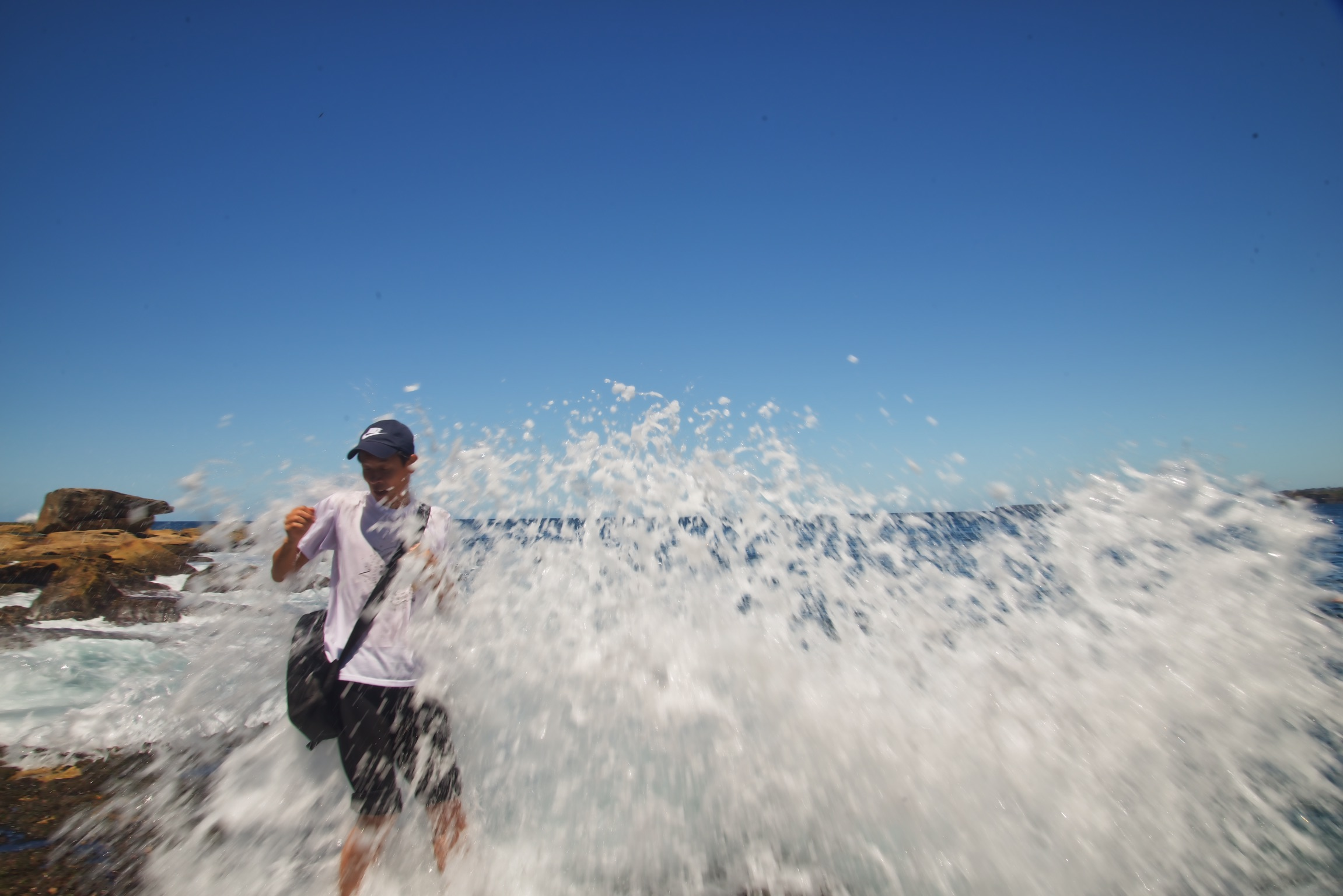
A broken wave pouring over people standing on the rocky shore at the northern end of Bondi Beach (2019)

There is an underwater shark net; however, it does not stretch the entire beach, it is made up of overlapping sections. Many other beaches along the same stretch of the coast have similar shark nets. Pods of whales and dolphins have been sighted in the bay during the months of migration (March–May, September–November). Fairy penguins, while uncommon, are sometimes also seen swimming close to shore or amongst surfers in southern line-ups.

In 2007, the Guinness World Record for the largest swimsuit photo shoot was set at Bondi Beach, with 1,010 women wearing bikinis taking part.

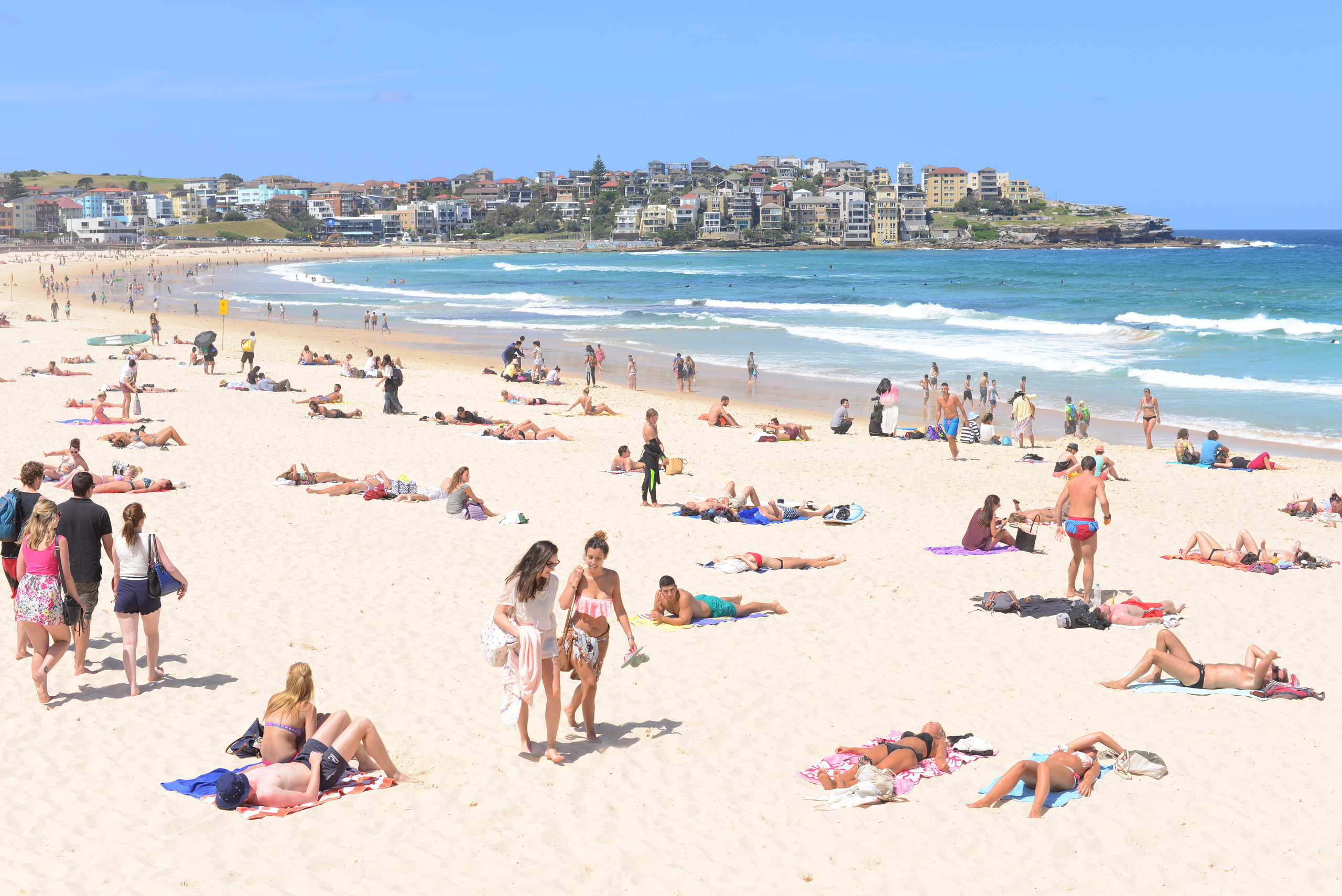
Activity on Bondi Beach in the late spring to early summer of 2014

In 2011, Waverley Council implemented Wi-Fi for Bondi Beach users. Service is free with limits on access periods and downloads per use. The cost of setup was estimated to be between $34,000 and $50,000 with annual costs of $25,000. Local businesses as well as The Bondi Chamber of Commerce supported the notion that locals and visitors can connect with local businesses, events, and other community and council events. In 2012 the Mayor of Waverley Sally Betts said that for the 2 million visitors annually, Wi-Fi offers access to local events and business information.

== Sport and recreation ==
Bondi Beach is represented in one of the most popular sporting competitions across Australia, the National Rugby League competition, by the local team the Sydney Roosters, officially the Eastern Suburbs District Rugby League Football Club (ESDRLFC).

Bondi Beach is the end point of the City to Surf Fun Run which is held each year in August. The race attracts over 63,000 entrants who complete the 14 km (9 mi) run from the Sydney central business district to Bondi Beach. Other annual activities at Bondi Beach include Flickerfest, Australia's premier international short film festival in January, World Environment Day in June, Sculpture by the Sea in November, and the Winter Magic Festival that attracted 60,000 visitors in 2016. In addition to many activities, the Bondi Beach Markets is open every Sunday, and a food market every Saturday, at Bondi Beach Public School. Many Irish and British tourists spend Christmas Day at the beach.

An Oceanway connects Bondi to South Head to the north and other beaches to the south up to Coogee.

Bondi Beach hosted the beach volleyball competition at the 2000 Summer Olympics. A temporary 10,000-seat stadium, a much smaller stadium, 2 warm-up courts, and 3 training courts were set up to host the tournament.

=== Lifesaving clubs ===
Bondi Surf Bathers' Life Saving Club claims to be the world's first surf lifesaving club; North Bondi Surf Life Saving Club is a federation club. Both clubs were founded in 1907. Club members invented the surf reel and many other icons of lifesaving. Surf lifesavers from both clubs were involved in the largest rescue ever on a single day, known as "Black Sunday". Bondi holds the most Australian Surf Lifesaving Championship gold medals in R&R (rescue & resuscitation), and North Bondi holds the most gold medals in March Past.

=== Bondi Icebergs ===
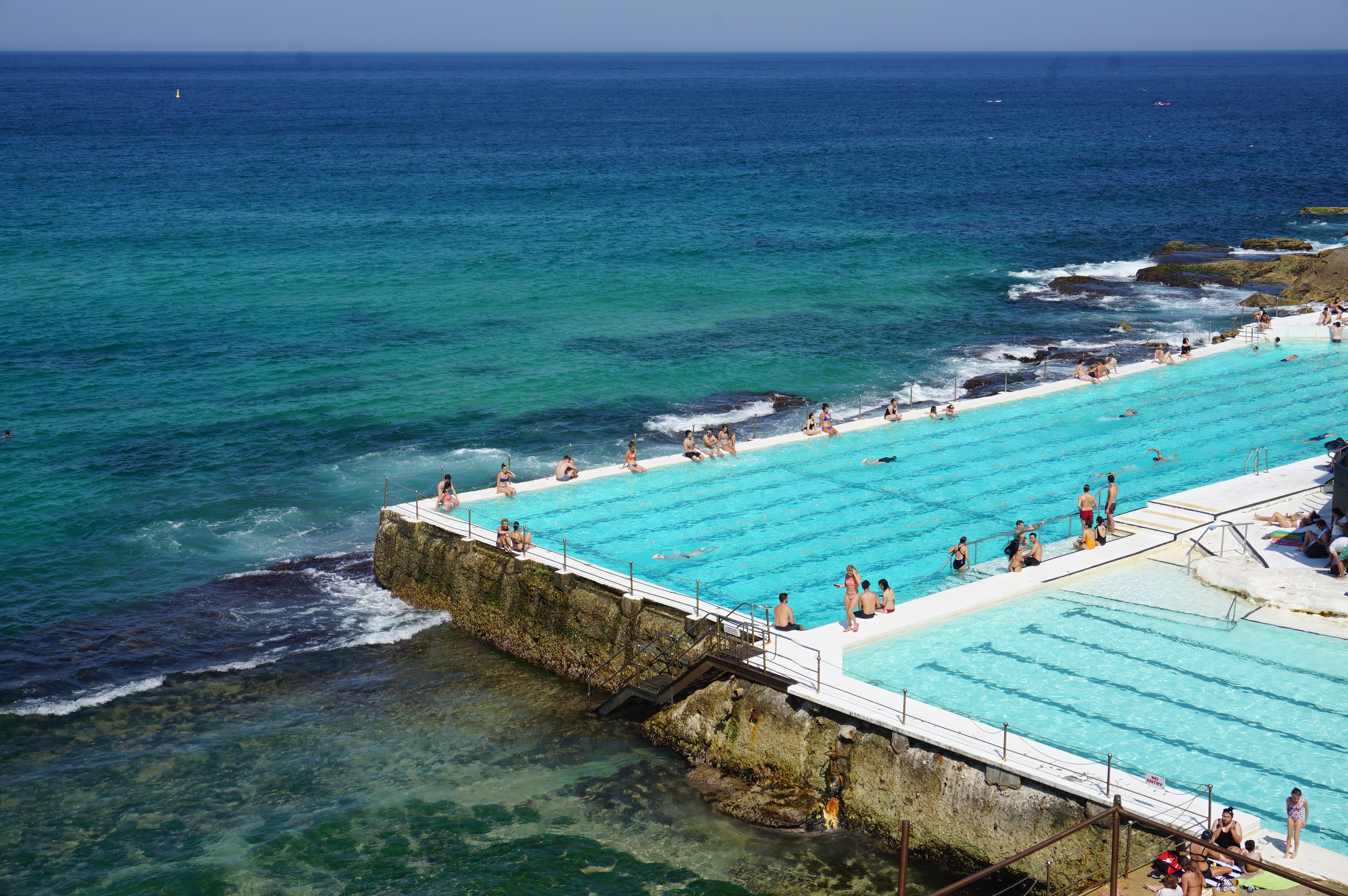
Bondi Icebergs Swimming Club

The Bondi Icebergs Swimming Club origin dates back to 1929 and owes its origins to the desire of a band of dedicated local lifesavers who wished to maintain their fitness during the winter months. They formed the Bondi Icebergs Winter Swimming Club, drew up a constitution, and elected office bearers. Included in the constitution was a rule that to maintain membership it was mandatory that swimmers compete on three Sundays out of four each month for five years.

=== Bondi Skate Park AUZ ===
The Bondi Skate Park opened to the public in 1991 with only two skate ramps. In 2004, the council sought consultation with the skating community for input on how best to upgrade the site. The end result was the construction of a bowl with a 3.7-metre (12 ft) deep end and a 1.5-metre (5 ft) shallow end, rated 4 out of 5 stars by Skateboard Australia. The bowl was designed by Chad Ford and built by the company Zalem. The park has been hosting BOWL-A-RAMA, an international skating competition, since 2004.

== Commercial area ==
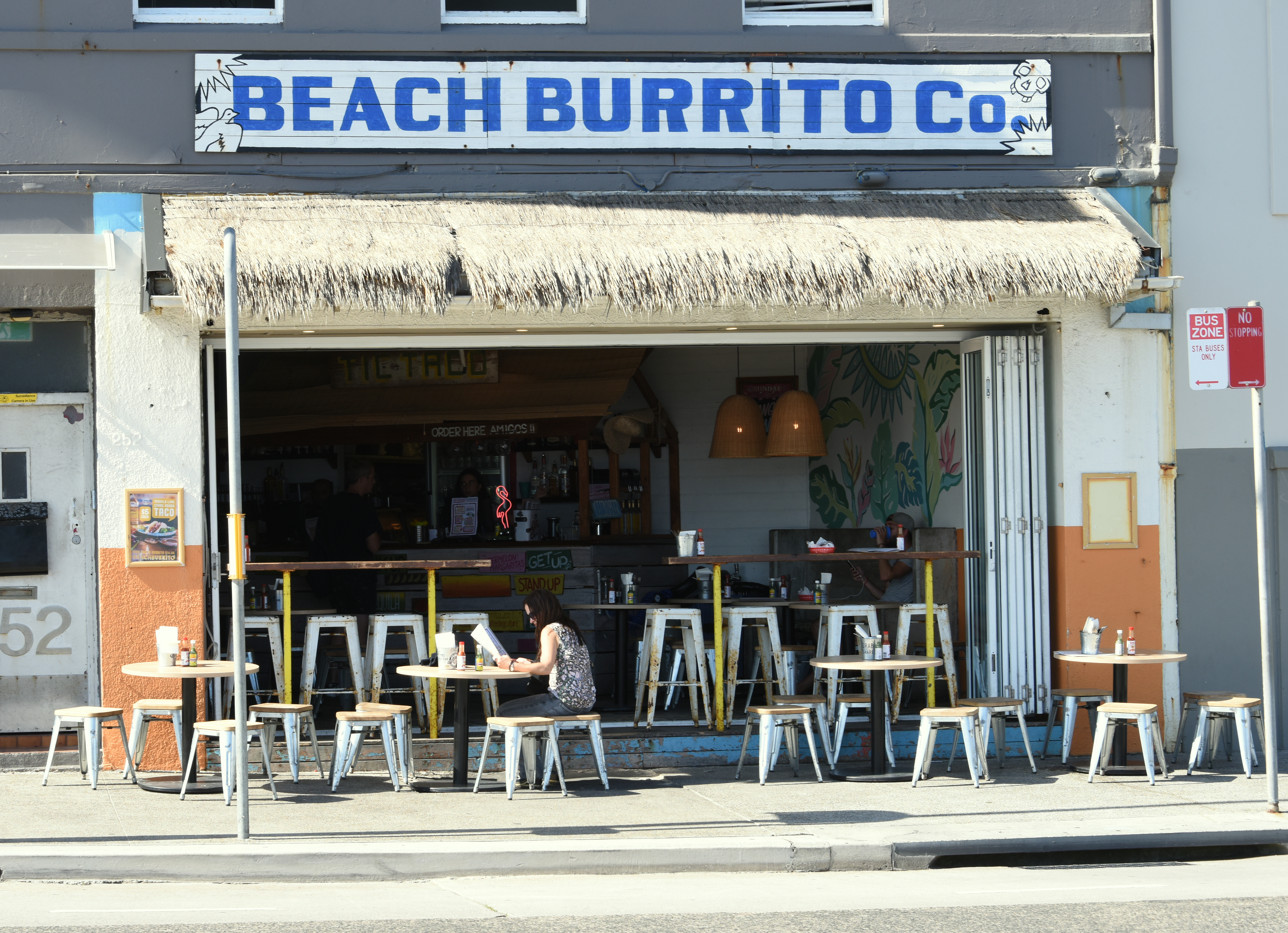
A cafe in Bondi Beach

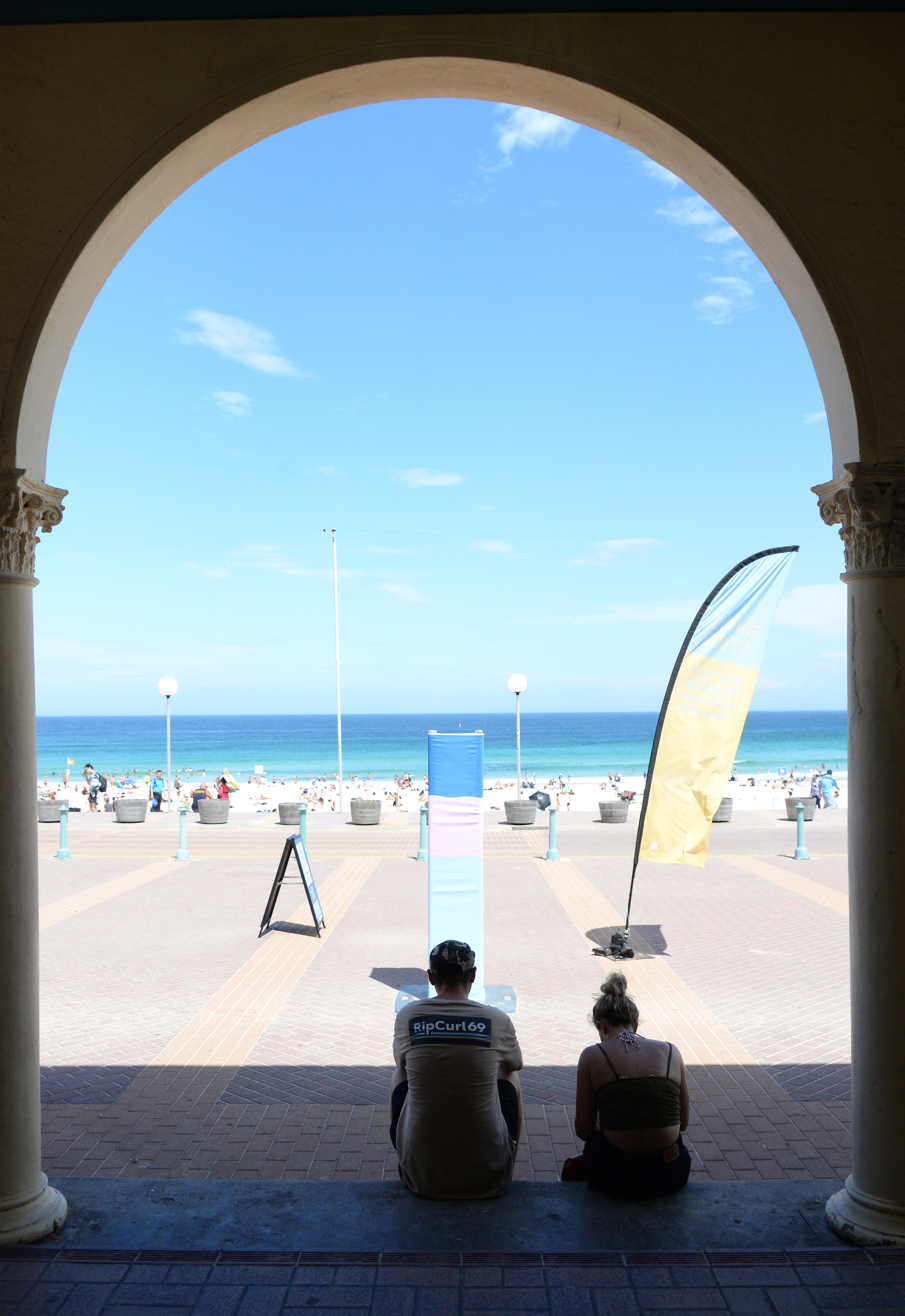
View from Bondi Pavilion

Bondi Beach has a commercial area along Campbell Parade and adjacent side streets, featuring many popular cafes, restaurants, and hotels, with views of the beach. Pacific Bondi Beach is a shopping centre that features Woolworths Metro, QT Hotel and 22 stores. It was built on site of the old Swiss Grand Hotel.

The Hotel Bondi is a landmark on Campbell Parade. It was built from 1915 to the 1920s and was designed by E. Lindsay Thompson. It combines Italianate, Federation and Free Classical elements and has been described as an "important landmark building in the Bondi Beach townscape." It has a state heritage listing. The Beach Road Hotel, originally opened in 1956 and was formerly The Regis and before that The Rex, is on the corner of Glenayr Avenue and Beach Road.

Bondi Pavilion is a community cultural centre, located right on Bondi Beach, which features a theatre, gallery, rehearsal, meeting and function rooms, art workshop, and studios. Bondi Pavilion is the centre for major festival performances throughout the year. It has a state heritage listing.

== Campbell Parade ==
The main street through Bondi Beach is Campbell Parade. It was rebuilt in the 1920s to a boulevard design opening in December 1929.

== Culture and events ==
Numerous festivals and events such as the annual Miss Bondi beauty pageant have made Bondi Beach a popular destination among travellers. The beach has long captured the attention of poets including Les Murray, Joanne Burns and Brook Emery. The Vans Bowl-A-Rama skateboarding competition is held at the Skate Bowl in February every year.

=== In popular culture ===
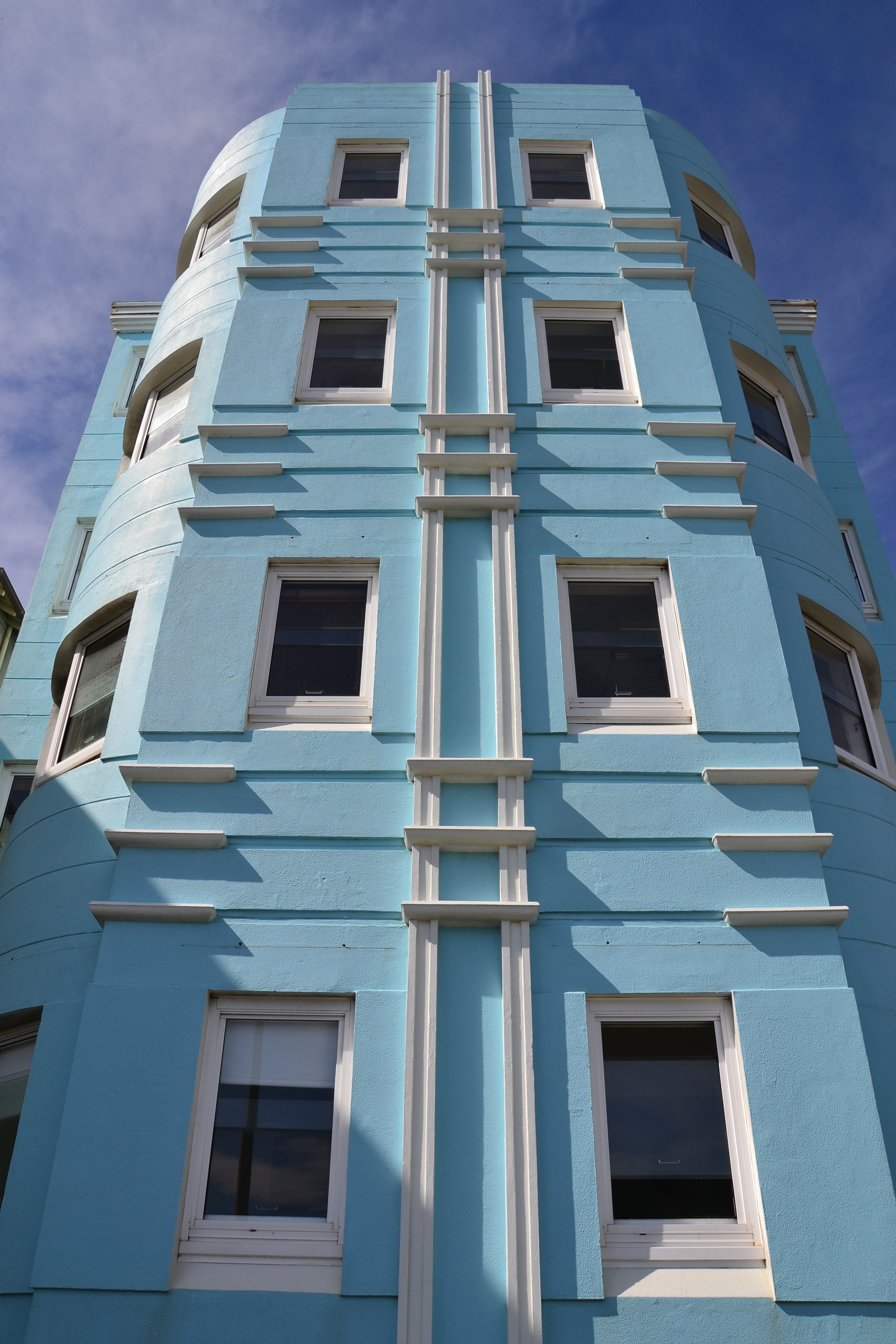
An example of Bondi's Art Deco architecture

Bondi Beach has been used as a location for numerous films, television series, music videos, and a video game:

- The Block is an Australian home renovation television series; its first season was filmed at Bondi Beach in 2003.
- Being Lara Bingle is a reality television series that followed model Lara Bingle and was set in Bondi.
- Deep Water is a 2016 mini-series set on Bondi Beach which was loosely based on a series of bashings and murders of 30–80 gay men in the late 1980s and early 1990s. A documentary, Deep Water: The Real Story was broadcast along with the fictionalised mini-series.
- Bondi Rescue is a factual television series about a team of lifeguards who patrol the beach.
- Bondi Vet is a factual television series based on veterinarian Chris Brown.
- Breakers is a television drama series filmed around Bondi Beach.
- The video game Tony Hawk's Underground 2's Level Australia is based on Bondi Beach.
- Les Norton, a popular Australian fictional character who stars in the Robert G. Barrett series of books, "lives" at Bondi in the stories.
- People Under the Stairs, an American hip-hop duo, filmed part of the video for their song "The Wiz" on Bondi Beach.
- Scooby-Doo! and the Legend of the Vampire, an American animated movie, included scenes set at Bondi Beach.
- Two Hands (1999 film), starring Heath Ledger.
- The 1959 film version of Summer of the Seventeenth Doll featured the characters drinking beer at the Bondi Iceberg's Club.
- The 1966 film They're a Weird Mob features a scene in which the star is rescued on Bondi Beach.
- Bondi Beach was featured in the Modern Family episode "Australia", which aired on U.S. television on 23 April 2014.
- In Top of the Lake Series 2, Robin investigates a case opened when a suitcase containing a woman's body washes up on Bondi Beach.
- In Season 3, Episode 12 of Lost a Bondi Beach t-shirt is used as swaddling for a baby, implying that one of the passengers on ill-fated Oceanic Airlines Flight 815 (which originated in Sydney, Australia) had been to Bondi Beach.
- In the 1930s and 40s, members of Graham Men's Gymnastics Club entertained beachgoers with acrobatics on the sand. The word "beachobatics" was coined.

== Population ==
=== Demographics ===
Bondi Beach is often considered to be one of Sydney's most densely populated suburbs, with a population density of 10,386/km^{2} in 2023. According to the 2021 census, there were 11,513 residents in Bondi Beach, of whom 48.7% were born in Australia. The most common countries of birth were England 10.6%, New Zealand 2.9%, the United States 2.7%, South Africa 2.4%, and France 2.2%. The census recorded that 72.1% of people only spoke English at home. Other languages spoken at home included Spanish 4.4%, French 2.9%, Italian 1.9%, Portuguese 1.8% and Russian 1.3%. The most common responses for religion in Bondi Beach were No Religion 51.2%, Catholic 18.4%, Judaism 7.6% and Anglican 6.0%.

=== Notable residents (past or present) ===
- Rose Byrne, actress
- James Packer, businessman
- Michael Clarke, Australian cricketer
- Larry Emdur, TV presenter
- Steven Kilbey, bass guitarist of rock band The Church
- Ed Oxenbould, actor
- Darren Palmer, interior designer

== Namesakes ==
- "Bondi Beach" was the name of a wave pool at Carowinds Theme Park in Fort Mill, South Carolina, United States.
- Bondi blue is a blue-green colour, first named when used as the exterior colour of the original iMac personal computer introduced in 1998 and named after the colour of the water at Bondi Beach.
- Bondi Burgers, served at Oporto restaurants, are named as such due to Oporto's originating in North Bondi. There is a chain of pizzerias in Sydney called Bondi Pizza, as well as a tanning lotion called Bondi Sands.

== See also ==
- Category:Landmarks in Australia
- List of beaches in Sydney
- Bondi Beach Cultural Landscape
- Little Bondi, Northern Territory
- Venues of the 2000 Summer Olympics
- Bondi Beach shooting
- Bronte Beach
- Coogee Beach

== Bibliography ==
- Huntmen, Leone (2001). Sand in Our Souls: The Beach in Australian History. Melbourne University Publishing. ISBN 0522849458.
