= Vans Bowl-A-Rama =

Defunct skateboarding event

Bowl-A-Rama was a skateboarding event held annually at Bondi Beach until 2018, and previously Wellington until 2014 and once in New York City in 2012. Founded in 2005, it was the richest skateboard competition in terms of prize money in Australia and New Zealand and was broadcast live on Fuel TV Australia. Vans held the naming rights to the event until 2018 when General Pants Co. sponsored Bowl-A-Rama.

The event was last held in 2018 at Bondi Beach. The 2019 event was rescheduled to 2020, however the event did not go ahead.

== Past winners ==
=== 2016 RESULTS ===
==== Masters division ====
1. Tony Hawk (USA)
2. Pat Ngoho (USA)
3. Renton Millar (AUS)

==== Men's division ====
1. Bucky Lasek (USA)
2. Cory Juneau (USA)
3. Tom Schaar (USA)

=== 2017 results ===
==== Men's division ====
1. Cory Juneau (USA)
2. Tom Schaar (USA)
3. Jono Schwan (USA)

==== Women's division ====
1. Jordyn Barratt (USA)
2. Brighton Zeuner (USA)
3. Poppy Olsen (AUS)

==== Masters division ====
1. Steve Caballero (USA)
2. Tony Hawk (USA)
3. Pat Ngoho (USA)

==== Junior results ====
1. Keegan Palmer (AUS)
2. Tate Carew (USA)
3. Taylor Nye (USA)

=== 2018 results ===
==== Men's division ====
1. Keegan Palmer (AUS)
2. Jono Schwan (USA)
3. Tom Schaar (USA)

==== Women's division ====
1. Sabre Norris (AUS)
2. Jordyn Barratt (USA)
3. Poppy Starr Olsen (AUS)

==== Masters division ====
1. Tony Hawk (USA)
2. Pat Ngoho (USA)
3. Nicky Guerrero (DEN)

==== Junior division ====
1. Tate Carew (USA)
2. Dylan Donnini (AUS)
3. Jed Ragen (AUS)
