= Thomas Dux Grocer =

Defunct Australian gourmet grocery store chain

- Industry: Retail
- Founded: 2008; 18 years ago
- Defunct: 2017; 9 years ago
- Number of locations: 11 (2014)
- Area served: Melbourne and Sydney
- Parent: Woolworths
- Website: www.thomasdux.com.au

Thomas Dux Grocer, also known as Thomas Dux, was an Australian chain of gourmet grocery stores operated by Woolworths from 2008 to 2017.

It sold a range of local and imported fresh foods and grocery items. Products included fresh fruit and vegetables, dairy products, artisan-style baked breads, oils and vinegars, pasta and sauces, condiments, prepared meals, chocolate products, fresh meat and fresh flowers. Thomas Dux specialised in organic, gluten-free, preservative-free and free-range foods. Local boutique suppliers included Saskia Beer, Maggie Beer, Simmone Logue, Herbies, Ornella, Phillippa's, Rowie's, Brasserie Bread, Irrewarra and Geoff Jansz. Fruit and vegetables were sourced directly from the wholesale markets in Sydney and Melbourne on a daily basis.

== History ==
Woolworths launched Thomas Dux, an upmarket grocery store, in April 2008 with the first store in the Sydney suburb of Lane Cove followed by another in Paddington.

In May 2009, Woolworths announced the acquisition of eight boutique grocery store leases in Crows Nest, Hornsby and Mona Vale in Sydney, and Armadale, Black Rock, Glen Waverley, Port Melbourne and Richmond in Melbourne from Macro Wholefoods, with the intention to rebadge the stores under the Thomas Dux brand. The first of the rebadged stores opened in August 2009.

From 2014, Woolworths started closing some stores, with speculation that the entire chain would be sold or closed.

In September 2014, Woolworths closed the Thomas Dux store in Surry Hills. The lease on the store was sold to About Life, a Sydney-based gourmet grocer. The Surry Hills store was the first of four leases Woolworths would ultimately sell to About Life by 2016.

In May 2015 the Richmond store was sold to Little Projects, which then demolished it and built a 13-story apartment building on the land dubbed "Dux Richmond Hill". In January 2016 the Glen Waverley store was closed, and throughout the remainder of 2016 Thomas Dux's Hornsby store in was closed, while its Crows Nest, Lane Cove and Port Melbourne outlets were taken over by About Life.

In 2017 the four remaining Thomas Dux stores were closed. The two remaining Melbourne locations, Black Rock and Armadale, as well as the Paddington store were rebranded as Woolworths Metro stores. The Mona Vale store was taken over by Flannerys. As of December 2017, Thomas Dux has ceased trading altogether. In 2021 the former Thomas Dux site at Black Rock was closed, which re-opened in 2026 as a Dan Murphy's liquor outlet. Woolworths has also exited the former Armadale site, which has since re-opened as a furniture store.

As at June 2021, Woolworths continued to sell limited gourmet products like cheese under the Thomas Dux brand. This was similar to after buying Macro Wholefoods and closing their stores, but keeping the brand alive as a healthier food range on Woolworths shelves.

== Stores ==
Suburb	Address	Previous use	Subsequent use	Date opened	Date closed
Surry Hills	285A Crown Street	Small Woolworths Supermarket	About Life Wholefoods Store, Office space	19 April 2008	September 2014
Lane Cove	62 Burns Bay Road	Food For Less supermarket, Franklins No Frills supermarket	About Life Wholefoods Store, Flannerys Organic Grocer, Pet store	19 April 2008	29 February 2016
Glen Waverley	Shop 2.200 The Glen	Macro Wholefoods store	Location taken over by food court after redevelopment of shopping centre; opened 28 March 2018	29 August 2009	31 January 2016
Crows Nest	13-19 Willoughby Road	Macro Wholefoods store	About Life Wholefoods Store, Flannerys Organic Grocer, Medical centre	10 October 2009	26 April 2016
Richmond	153 Bridge Road	Macro Wholefoods store	Residential Apartment Tower	6 November 2009	31 May 2015
Port Melbourne	120 Bay Street	Development site	About Life Wholefoods Store, Independent supermarket	7 January 2010	29 February 2016
Hornsby	Shop 2009 Westfield Hornsby	Macro Wholefoods store	Toys R Us, Uniqlo	26 September 2009	April 2016
Armadale	1068 High Street	Macro Wholefoods store	Woolworths Metro Supermarket, MCM House (Furniture store)	19 September 2009	4 July 2017
Paddington	220 Glenmore Road	Small Woolworths supermarket	Woolworths Metro Supermarket	13 August 2008	October 2017
Mona Vale	12-14 Park Street	Macro Wholefoods store	Flannerys Organic Grocer	5 September 2009	December 2017
Black Rock	40 Bluff Road	Macro Wholefoods store	Woolworths Metro Supermarket, Dan Murphy's Liquor Outlet	3 October 2009	4 July 2017
