= Bondi Beach Post Office =

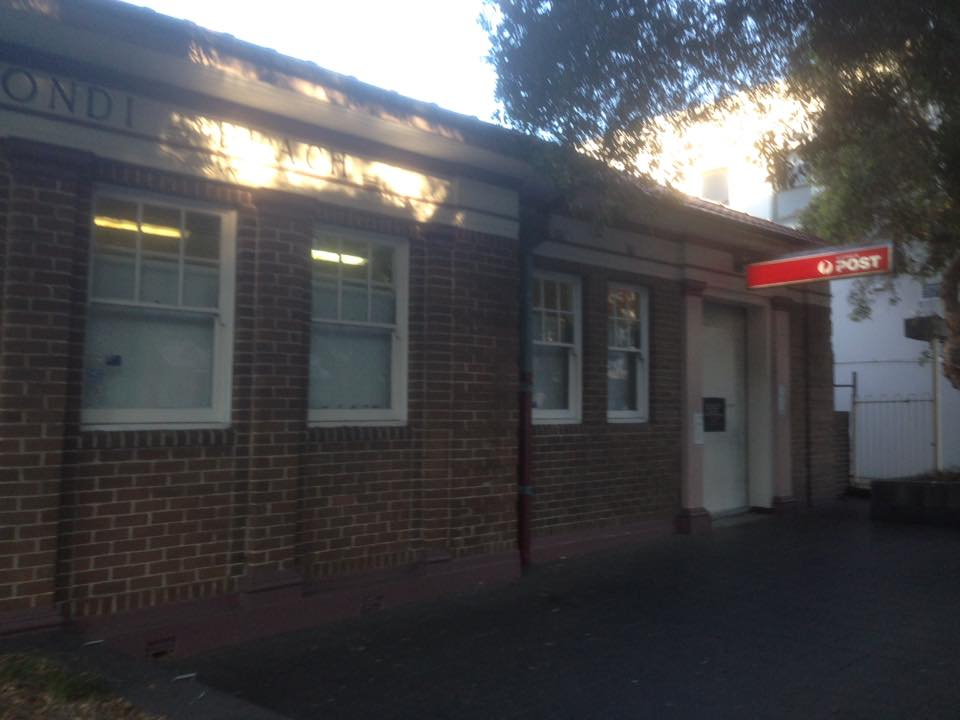
- Bondi Beach Post Office, 2017

- Location within Sydney
- 33.8908°S 151.2728°E
- Location: 20 Hall Street, Bondi Beach, Sydney, New South Wales, Australia

Site notes
- Architect: EH Henderson

Commonwealth Heritage List
- Official name: Bondi Beach Post Office
- Type: Listed place (Historic)
- Designated: 22 August 2012
- Reference no.: 106174

Bondi Beach Post Office is a heritage-listed post office at 20 Hall Street, Bondi Beach, Sydney, New South Wales, Australia. It was added to the Australian Commonwealth Heritage List on 22 August 2012.

== History ==
In the early 1800s swimming at Sydney's beaches was considered to be a controversial pastime, although becoming more popular by mid-century. In this period, Bondi Beach was seen as being too remote from central Sydney. By the 1900s, however, restrictive attitudes to swimming began to relax and the beach became associated with healthy recreation and leisure activities.

Bondi Beach was also declared a "public beach" in the 1880s, and the first tramway reached the beach in this period. Bondi Beach became a popular attraction for families and recreational swimmers. Waverley Municipal Council built the first surf bathing sheds in the early 1900s, and the famous Bondi Pavilion in 1929. By the 1930s Bondi was drawing not only local visitors but also people from elsewhere in Australia and overseas.

As Bondi grew in popularity as a popular surfing beach in the interwar period, so did the development and suburbanisation of the area. The Bondi Beach Post Office was erected in 1922, at the time the area was growing and developing. The architectural design is attributed to EH Henderson of the Commonwealth Department of Works and Railways, under the supervision of George Oakeshott. Additions to the Hall Street section of the building were undertaken in 1934.

The Oakeshott-Henderson designed post offices for the Australian Department of Works and Railways appeared in regional and suburban locations in New South Wales in the early 1920s. These represented the takeover by the Australian Government of a previously New South Wales Government architects' preserve, but in a manner varyingly distinct from the Murdoch-Mackennal flavoured incursions in other states. Bondi Beach, in particular, concentrated its entry in a smaller and tighter corner placement, angled and hemmed in by two flanking columns. The three most direct counterparts for Bondi beach were at Waverley (1923), the plainer Beecroft (1925) and Coffs Harbour Jetty (1926). These all incorporated the Commonwealth institutional signature of brick rustication in their piers, but differed in the general pattern of smaller Australian post offices in other respects.

In this Bondi Beach reflected the generally small, tight proportioning becoming widespread in New South Wales housing and small institutional buildings, partly due to distinctively small property divisions and all being in brick. Examples are at Wallandbeen (1915), Warren (1916), Weston (1916), Botany (1917) and Kendall (c. 1921). Where any sites were broader, New South Wales post offices invariably shifted to the "Queensland" dual entrance breakfront pattern on Murdoch-Mackennal lines and developed earlier in other states. In New South Wales these appeared at Holbrook (1920), Gordon (1922), Grenfell (c. 1923), Broadmeadow (1924) and Dunedoo (1925).

This period also saw a gradual shift toward square footprint designs with symmetrical pyramid or hipped roof designs such as Yenda (1920), Killara (1923), Roseville (1924, the very similar Lawson (1925), the in antis columned Merewether (1925), Millthorpe (1927), and the round-arched pair at Rose Bay (1928) and Concord (1930). There were smaller post offices with asymmetrical elevations but still square-roof plans and footprints. These included Belmore (1925), Branxton and Bulli (both 1926), Kandos and Yanco (both 1927).

These symmetrical roofed post offices found close counterparts interstate as at Glen Iris in Victoria or Nundah in Queensland (1928–30). These were in addition to the more general breakfront post offices that marked the Commonwealth dominance of post office design after c. 1920. These in effect also marked the high tide of Neo-Georgian pavilion post offices in Australia, though Old Colonial and Georgian revivalism had been evident in Government architectural thinking long before that (e.g. Armidale, 1880–1916).

Of the post offices referred to in the above analysis, only the Bondi Beach post office and Botany (NSW), Rose Bay (NSW), Nundah (Qld) and Armidale (NSW) remain in Australia Post ownership.

== Description ==
Bondi Beach Post Office is at 20 Hall Street, corner Jaques Avenue, Bondi, comprising the whole of Lot 2 DP329116. Located on the corner of Hall Street and Jacques Avenue, the post office displays some landmark qualities in this context. The building has an assured corner presentation, makes a contribution to the local/immediate streetscape heritage character, and accordingly demonstrates aesthetic value at a local level. Jacques Avenue and Hall Street are linked, compositionally, by a diagonally angled entry porch with a flat aluminium-surfaced roof that is concealed from view from the street by a parapet.

The entry is framed by a pair of Tuscan columns and a cement rendered entablature, extended around the street elevations as a cornice. A cement rendered plinth also runs around the street elevations, turning into two pedestals either side of the porch to support the flanking columns. Both street frontages of the original building have three sets of double-hung sash windows divided by brick pilasters with rendered capitals and bases, and with each pair separated by a set of broader piers in exposed face brick, each pier rusticated in the Australian Post Office "signature" style developed by Murdoch and Mackennal around 1909-10 in Victoria. The later addition facing Hall Street has repeated this treatment (see below). A subsequent addition facing Jacques Avenue has only two double-hung sash windows, which are sympathetic.

The interior of the former corner porch has been enclosed to form the Postal Manager's office, and is accessed from the retail area. The porch in its original configuration was probably cement rendered and lit by small rectangular windows facing Hall Street and Jacques Avenue. The entablature above the former porch is inscribed Post Office and both the Jacques Avenue and Hall Street continuation of the entablature were inscribed "Bondi Beach". An additional entry to the post hall was on the Hall Street elevation, flanked by two rendered pilasters. This is part of a later addition. The eaves were boxed with planking transverse to the streets; the gutters and downpipes are copper. The window sills were bull-nosed in a standard domestic manner. Inside, the plaster and beam ceilings were intact as late as 1990, though the Valuation Report notes the ceilings as being currently in painted plasterboard.

A large west end addition was made in 1934, facing Hall Street, designed by H Sturtevant during C Todd's period as Commonwealth Works Director. Sturtevant re-used original west-facing windows and carefully matched existing base and cornice lines. An alcove in the porch was fitted with public phone booths but now forms a storeroom. The base of the porch has been altered to a slight incline to provide disabled access to the building, and this porch has a roller shutter fitted across its opening. Steel mesh fencing has been erected in front of the small yard and loading dock facing Jacques Avenue. A postal box porch on the Jacques Avenue elevation and telephone booths in front of the same elevation, have diminished the building's integrity.

It is unclear if this post office had associated residential quarters as many others did.

=== Key areas/elements ===
- Compact domestic scale and massing
- Corner presentation with some landmark qualities

=== Condition ===
When last inspected, the building was in fair condition. Externally it was relatively intact, but internally the building has a relatively low level of intactness.

=== Original fabric ===
The original fabric of the building that still exists includes:

- Structural frame: reinforced concrete footings. Timber floor in retail area and concrete floor slab elsewhere.
- External walls: face brick and cement render in finish; load-bearing masonry.
- Internal walls: stud frame clad in painted plasterboard or fibrous plaster.
- Floor: reinforced concrete with carpet and vinyl cladding to the back areas and timber floor finished in carpet in retail and some office areas, a vinyl tiled lunchroom and storage area, and ceramic tiles in the wet areas.
- Ceiling: painted plasterboard and probably painted fibrous plaster in places. In the rear back office area there is a suspended ceiling. Air conditioning ducts flush-mounted in retail space.
- Roof: timber frame; terra-cotta tile cladding with aluminium membrane-clad flat roof above entry porch.

== Heritage listing ==
Bondi Beach Post Office was listed on the Australian Commonwealth Heritage List on 22 August 2012 having satisfied the following criteria.

Criterion A: Processes

Bondi Beach Post Office, constructed in 1922 to a design by EH Henderson of the Commonwealth Department of Works and Railways, and subsequently extended, is of local historic value. The building is associated with a period of local growth and development, in the interwar period, when Bondi Beach became a popular beach resort and attraction for families and recreational swimmers. The famous beach pavilion was constructed in 1929, and by the 1930s Bondi was drawing local and international visitors. As Bondi grew in popularity, so did the development and suburbanisation of the area. The interwar heritage character of the building, reflecting this important period of local development, and the building's prominent corner location, enhance this aspect of significance.

Criterion D: Characteristic values

Bondi Beach Post Office is an example of a:

- post office and telegraph office with quarters (second generation typology 1870–1929)
- interwar period building in the Colonial/Georgian Revival Style
- building by E H Henderson, Commonwealth Department of Works and Railways, under direction of George Oakeshott

Typologically, the building's original planning has been impacted by the enclosure of the former corner porch, to form the Postal Manager's office; an additional entry to the postal hall was located on the Hall Street elevation, now part of the later addition made in 1934 by H Sturtevant. A postal box porch on the Jaques Avenue elevation and telephone booths in front of the same elevation, have also impacted on the building's presentation.

Stylistically and architecturally, Bondi Beach is typical of a small group of compact, domestically scaled brick post offices in New South Wales designed by E H Henderson under George Oakshott's aegis as State head of the Commonwealth Public Works office. It also reflects and develops several design signatures worked out by Murdoch and Mackennal in other states. The building is also one of four still operating as a post office designed between 1923 and 1926 that adopt a columned corner entry in a tight domestic cottage-form, and were a genre distinct to New South Wales. More formally, it is a companion design of the pyramidal or oblong hipped-roofed post offices designed for small suburban and regional settings between 1920 and 1930, which again had their main airing in New South Wales, but were tried out in other states as well.

Criterion E: Aesthetic characteristics

Bondi Beach Post Office, located on the corner of Hall Street and Jacques Avenue, displays some landmark qualities in this context. The building has an assured corner presentation, makes a contribution to the local/immediate streetscape heritage character, and accordingly demonstrates aesthetic value at a local level.
