= Duopsony =

Restrictive market structures
Quantity	one	two	few
Sellers	Monopoly	Duopoly	Oligopoly
Buyers	Monopsony	Duopsony	Oligopsony

In economics, a duopsony is a market structure in which only two buyers substantially control the market as the major purchasers of goods and services offered by many would-be sellers. The microeconomic theory of duopsony assumes two entities to have market power over all sellers as the only two purchasers of a good or service. This is a similar power to that of a Duopolist, which can influence the price for its buyers in a Duopoly, where multiple buyers have only two sellers of a good or service available to purchase from.

== Characteristics ==
Duopsony is characterized by a small number of buyers and a large number of sellers, which results in buyers having significant market power over sellers. With only two buyers, suppliers have limited options to sell their goods or services, which allows the buyers to exert greater influence over price and other terms of trade.

In a duopsony, buyers may also engage in strategic behavior, such as colluding to reduce the price they pay for goods or services or engaging in exclusive dealing arrangements with suppliers. These actions can further limit the bargaining power of suppliers and result in reduced competition in the market.

== Examples ==
Examples of duopsony include the market for agricultural products, where a small number of large buyers purchase crops from numerous small-scale farmers, and the market for labor, where a small number of employers purchase labor from a large pool of workers.

In the agricultural market, large retailers such as Walmart and Kroger are often the only buyers of certain crops, such as tomatoes, which allows them to dictate the terms of trade with suppliers. In the labor market, large employers such as Amazon and Walmart have significant market power over workers, which can result in lower wages and reduced benefits for employees.

== Implications ==
Duopsony can have significant implications for market outcomes, including reduced competition, lower supplier prices, and reduced supply of goods or services. As buyers have greater market power, they can negotiate lower prices with suppliers, resulting in reduced profits for suppliers and reduced investment in production.

Moreover, duopsony can also result in reduced innovation and product quality, as suppliers may need more incentives to invest in research and development or improve product quality if they cannot negotiate higher prices from buyers.

== See also ==
- Duopoly
- Monopsony
- Monopoly
