= Woolworths Metro =

Australian retail chain

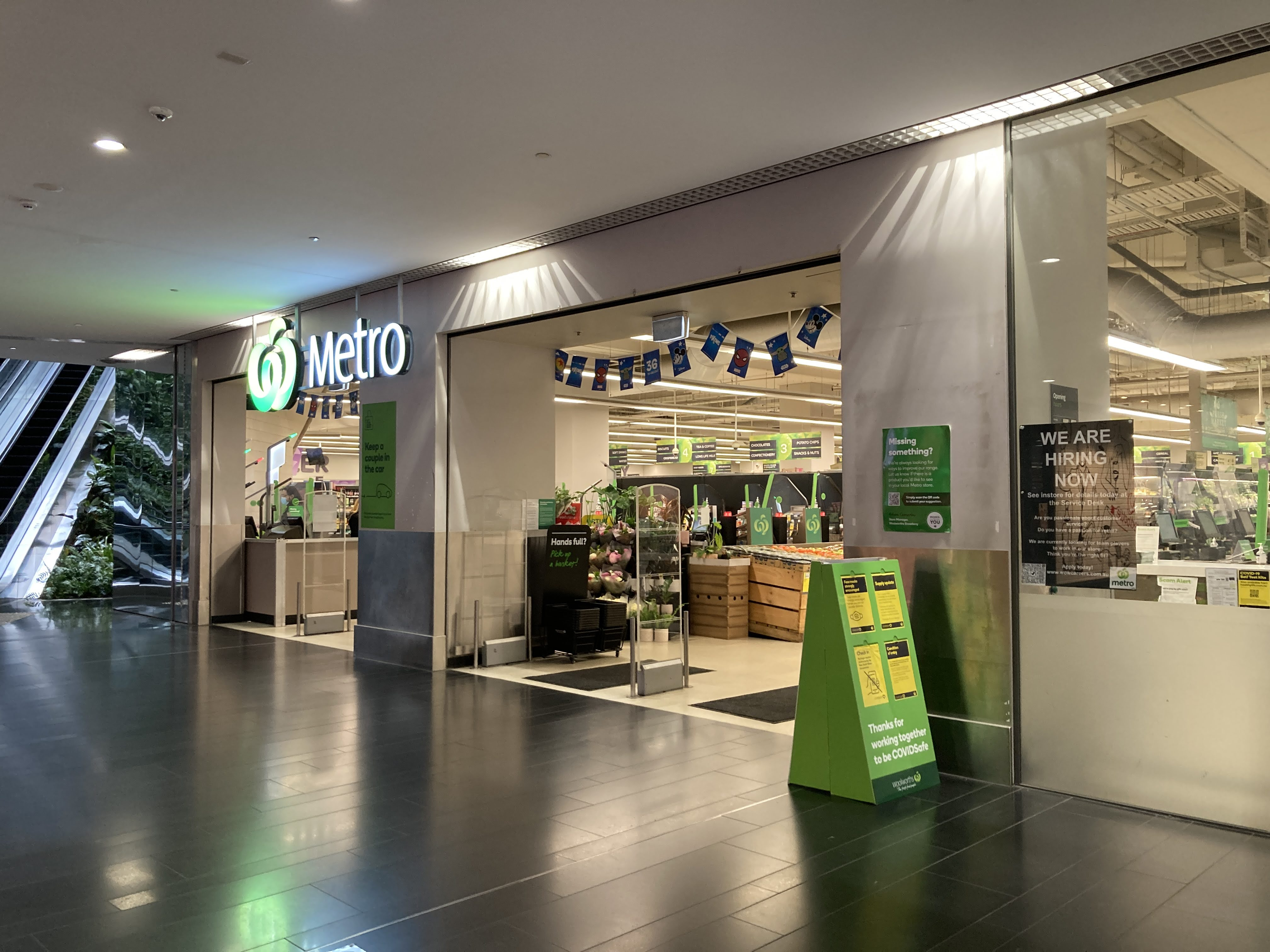
- Metro store in Central Park, Sydney
- Trade name: Woolworths Supermarkets
- Type: Subsidiary
- Industry: Retail
- Founded: 1997 (initial); 2013 (restructure); 2019 (New Zealand)
- Headquarters: Bella Vista, New South Wales, Australia
- Number of locations: 101 stores (2025)
- Area served: Australia, New Zealand
- Key people: Amanda Bardwell (CEO), Woolworths Group; Nathan Shaw (General Manager National Operations), Metro
- Revenue: ▲ A$309 million (2023)
- Parent: Woolworths Group
- Website: www.woolworths.com.au/shop/discover/metro

Woolworths Metro, styled as simply Metro, is a subsidiary chain of small retail stores owned and operated by Woolworths in Australia. Metro specialises in "grab and go" food, ready made meals, beverages and other goods, as well as a range of in-demand local and imported products. Unlike supermarkets, Metro stores have a smaller floor space and are often designed for foot traffic and public transport in central business districts and inner city suburbs. There are currently 101 Woolworths Metro locations Australia-wide.

The Metro brand is composed of purpose built stores, primarily found in CBD’s and dense population centres, and transition stores which are either former stores of defunct brands such as Thomas Dux Grocer, or smaller Woolworths Supermarkets put under the Metro brand and refurbished. Metro is also the outlet of rapid grocery and food delivery service Metro60, now rebranded as MilkRun, which offers under one hour grocery delivery from 500 locations in Sydney, Melbourne, Canberra and the Gold Coast.

Until 2023, Ampol operated a chain of MetroGo convenience stores.
