= List of supermarket chains in Oceania =

This is a list of supermarket chains in Oceania.

== Australia ==
=== Current ===
==== Aldi Australia ====
Aldi is a German multinational corporation which operates discount supermarkets.

- Aldi – 602 stores (200 in New South Wales, 168 in Victoria, 120 in Queensland, 54 in Western Australia, 47 in South Australia, and 13 in Australian Capital Territory)
- Aldi Corner Store – 7 stores (4 in Sydney, New South Wales and 3 in Melbourne, Victoria)

==== Australian United Retailers Limited ====
Australian United Retailers Limited (AUR) is a member owned and operated co-operative of 564 independently owned supermarkets, convenience stores and liquor retailers. There are 30 retail banners that AUR supports.

- FoodStore – 1 store
- FoodWorks – 329 stores (109 in Victoria, 109 in New South Wales, 94 in Queensland, 11 in Western Australia, 2 in Australian Capital Territory, 2 in Tasmania, and 2 in South Australia)
- FoodWorks Asian Supermarket

Supplied by AUR

- 7"2"7 Foodstore – 1 store (Tarragindi, Queensland)
- Blackwood Fresh FoodWorks – 1 store (Bridgetown, Western Australia)
- Broadbeach Grocer & Café – 1 store (Broadbeach, Queensland)
- Campus & Co. – online
- Country Grocers & Liquor – 5 stores
- Farmer Jack's Supermarket – 12 stores
- Goods Grocer – 1 store
- Grocery & Liquor Co. – 2 stores (Bell Post Hill and Newtown, Victoria)
- Hannan's Marketplace by Foodworks – 1 store (Kalgoorlie, Western Australia)
- Koh's Marketplace – 1 store (Springvale South, Victoria)
- LaManna Supermarket – 1 store (Essendon, Victoria)
- Market Europa – 2 stores (Heatherton, Victoria)
- McCoppins – 3 stores
- MH & Co. – 7 stores
- NightOwl – 79 stores
- Sam Coco Trading – 1 store
- The Burnley Grocer & Liquor Merchant – 1 store
- The Greener Grocer – 1 store (Maroubra, New South Wales)
- The Happy Apple – 4 stores (Ascot Vale, Essendon, Newport and Seddon, Victoria)
- Whole Farms Market – 3 stores
- Your Go To Grocer – 8 stores owned by Reddrop Group (Victoria)

==== Coles Group ====
- Coles Supermarkets – 830 stores (244 in New South Wales, 219 in Victoria, 180 in Queensland, 99 in Western Australia, 50 in South Australia, 17 in Tasmania, 13 in Australian Capital Territory, and 8 in Northern Territory)
- Coles Local – 31 stores (10 in Victoria, 10 in New South Wales, 6 in Queensland, 4 in Western Australia, and 1 in South Australia)

==== Costco Australia ====
Costco Wholesale Corporation is an American multinational corporation which operates a chain of membership-only big-box warehouse club retail stores. Costco stores typically have food courts.

- 2 stores in Western Australia:
  - Perth Airport
  - Casuarina
- 1 store in South Australia:
  - Kilburn
- Stores are also located in:
  - Victoria
  - New South Wales
  - Queensland
  - ACT

==== Metcash Trading ====
- IGA
- IGA Local Grocer
- Foodland IGA – 90 stores (New South Wales, South Australia)
- Supa Valu – 4 stores (New South Wales, Victoria and Western Australia)
- Eziway Food Stores – 1 store (Shelley, Western Australia)
- Village Grocer

==== Progressive Trading Proprietary Limited ====
Progressive Supa IGA consisted of 16 stores, 12 Progressive Stores and 4 Supa IGA Stores. The last Progressive Supa IGA (Spearwood Progressive Supa IGA) closed in February 2019, and Leda Supa IGA was demolished in 2018. High Wycombe Supa IGA was sold to Pham Group IGA. Shoalwater IGA was sold in 2024 to become an independent IGA Store. Waterford IGA became a Spud Shed store in 2026. Progressive Supa IGA's parent company Progressive Trading Pty Ltd is a joint venture between BMS Bendigo Retail Group Vic and Metcash.

Progressive Supa IGA (Western Australia only) stores

- Girrawheen Supa IGA (owned by Progressive Trading Pty Ltd) has been rebranded Supa Valu Girrawheen.
- Vale IGA

==== Supermarkets West ====
Supermarkets West Pty Ltd opened its First Farmer Jack's Family Supermarket in 1987, and each of the stores is independently owned and operated by local franchisees. FoodWorks Supermarkets are also locally owned and operated and Supermarkets West use the name under licence from Australian United Retailers Limited.

- Farmer Jack's Family Supermarkets – 12 stores owned by Fred Fairthorne after he closed two supermarkets in Ocean Reef and Lakeside Joondalup (Western Australia)
- Farmer Jack's Supermarkets – 2 stores, independently owned (Moora and Forrestfield, Western Australia)
- FoodWorks – Used under licence (Western Australia only) has one store in Perth Metropolitan Area in Kenwick. The chain has many regional area stores.

==== Woolworths Group ====
- Woolworths
- Woolworths Metro

==== Current independent chains ====
- Ampol Foodary (Ampol Woolworths) – 1,834 stores, petrol station convenience (Australia wide)
- EG Fuels (Ampol Woolworths)
- Bernardi's – 5 stores, fresh format supermarket (Central West New South Wales)
- Champions IGA – 12 stores (Victoria)
- Drakes Supermarkets – 75 stores (South Australia and Queensland)
- Foodland IGA Supermarkets – 90 stores (South Australia, Northern Territory and Broken Hill, New South Wales)
- Freshplus – 2 stores (Craigieburn, Dallas, Victoria)
- Fresh Provisions – 2 stores (Bicton, Mount Lawley, Western Australia)
- Fresh & Save Food Warehouses – 9 stores, Queensland owned and operated (7 in Queensland and 2 in New South Wales)
- Friendly Grocer – 215 stores (Australian Capital Territory, New South Wales, Queensland, South Australia and Victoria)
- Harris Farm Markets – 30 stores (Australian Capital Territory, New South Wales and Queensland)
- Khurasan Supermarket KSM IGA – 2 stores (Prospect, Valley View, South Australia)
- Le Max Group Supermarkets – 4 stores (Victoria)
  - Leo's Fine Food & Wine – 3 stores (Glen Iris, Heidelberg, Kew)
  - Maxi Foods – 1 store (Upper Ferntree Gully)
- Maloneys Grocer – 4 stores (New South Wales)
- MarketPlace Fresh – 12 stores (Victoria and Australian Capital Territory)
- Miracle Supermarkets – 7 stores, Asian supermarket (New South Wales)
- MKS Spices 'N Things – 4 stores, South Asian, South East Asian and East Asian supermarket (Victoria)
- NightOwl – 85 stores, convenience format, founded in 1975
- NQR – 27 stores and online, owned and operated by Tradeorigins Pty Ltd (Victoria, South Australia)
- Outback Stores – 58 stores, Indigenous Australian owned and backed buying group in outback Aboriginal communities (38 in Northern Territory, 15 in Western Australia, 2 New South Wales, 2 in South Australia, 1 in Queensland)
- Panetta Mercato – 7 stores, fresh food market (Sydney, New South Wales)
- QE Food stores – 10 stores (Sydney, New South Wales)
- Ritchie's – 156 stores (IGA Supermarkets in New South Wales, Victoria and Australian Capital Territory)
- Romeo's – 39 stores (Foodland IGA, Food Hall Supermarkets and Supa Valu IGA in South Australia and New South Wales)
- SPAR Australia – 115 stores (Australian Capital Territory, New South Wales and Queensland)
  - 5 Star – A member of SPAR Australia (Australian Capital Territory, New South Wales, Northern Territory and Queensland)
- Spudshed – 18 stores (Western Australia)
- Supabarn – 22 stores (Australian Capital Territory and New South Wales)
- The Reject Shop – 397 stores, some grocery goods available mostly 'discount variety' (Australia-wide)
- Tong Li – 18 stores, Asian Supermarket (New South Wales)
- Tony & Marks – 8 stores, founded in 1978 (South Australia)
- X Convenience – 40 stores, founded in 2006 (South Australia and Western Australia)

==== Current independent retailers ====
- DD's Bargain Basement – 1 store (Thomastown, Victoria)
- Festival City Wine and Foods – 1 store, food wholesaler (Cheltenham, South Australia)
- Gaganis Brothers – 1 store (Hindmarsh, South Australia)
- Galati and Sons – 1 store (Fremantle, Western Australia)
- Metro Fresh – 1 store (Findon, South Australia)
- Omega Foods – 1 store, cash and carry warehouse continental deli and supermarket, founded in 1979 (Hindmarsh, South Australia)
- Seaton Supreme Foods – 1 store (Seaton, South Australia)
- Value Mart – 1 store (Bundall, Queensland)

=== Former ===
==== Metcash Trading Limited ====
- IGA Xpress
- Supa IGA – rebranded as IGA

==== Australian United Retailers Limited ====
- AUR – rebranded as FoodWorks in 2003.
- Buy Rite – taken over by AUR in the 1990s, rebranded as FoodWorks in 2003.
- Food-Rite
- Food-Way
- SSW – SSW stood for "Self Service Wholesalers", but stores were always branded as SSW, rebranded as Festival IGA Supermarkets in 1993 (mainly in Victoria)
  - Harry Heaths – 6 stores, taken over by SSW (Victoria metro Melbourne including Heidelberg, Forest Hill, Nunawading, Chirnside Park, Epping Plaza, Balwyn)
  - Rite-Way Cut Price Supermarkets – rebranded as Super-Rite between 1969 and 1985.
  - Super-Rite – rebranded SSW between 1985 and 1993.
- Tuckerbag (AUR, FoodWorks)

==== Coles Group ====
At various times Coles Myer, Coles Group & Wesfarmers.

- Bi-Lo Supermarkets – supermarket chain established in 1979 in South Australia. It was bought by Coles Myer in 1987 and later expanded nationally. Coles started converting stores from late 2006. It withdrew from Victoria in 2009, and from New South Wales in 2016. The last store, located at Loganholme, Queensland, closed 30 June 2017. Most Bi-Lo stores were rebranded as Coles.
- Crittendens
- Dickins Foodmarkets
- Newmart – Rebranded as Coles in 2003. Some stores sold to Foodland Associated Limited Group and rebranded as Action. (Western Australia only)
- Pick 'n Pay Hypermarket – 2 stores, rebranded to other store names within the Wesfarmers Group. (Aspley and Sunnybank Hills, Queensland)
- Shoeys – rebranded as Bi-Lo in 1987. (New South Wales only)
- Super Kmart – rebranded to Coles supermarkets and Kmart discount department stores in the early 1990s.

==== Davids Holdings ====
- Clancy's – rebranded as IGA in 2006. (Western Australia only)
- Festival IGA Supermarkets – rebranded as IGA in 2000. (Australian Capital Territory and New South Wales)
- Fishers – 16 stores, founded in 1911 by the Fisher family and was managed by fourth-generation owner Alan Fisher, employing more than 900 staff when they sold to Ritchie's for A$20 million in 2015 (Victoria including Hamilton, Merbein, Irymple, Ararat, Robinvale, Kerang, Mooroopna, New South Wales and Mount Gambier, South Australia)
- Foodland Supermarkets – rebranded as Foodland IGA. (South Australia only)
- Foodmaster Supermarkets – rebranded as Welcome Mart or Foodtown in 1992 (Australian Capital Territory)
- Foodtown (Australian Capital Territory and Victoria)
- Franklins – sold to Metcash in 2010.
- Franklins Big Fresh – all stores closed or sold off in 2001. (Queensland, New South Wales and Victoria)
- Fresco Supermarkets – all but one store were taken over and rebranded as Franklins in 2002. (New South Wales only)
- Jewel Supermarkets – rebranded as IGA in 2000.
- Nancarrows – Woolworths sold this division to Davids Holdings, many rebranded as Foodtown and Welcome Mart. (Victoria only)
- Welcome Mart (Australian Capital Territory and New South Wales)

==== Foodland Associated Limited ====
- Action Food Barns – 31 stores
- Action Supermarkets – 49 stores sold to and rebranded as Woolworths, remaining stores rebranded as IGA in 2006. (Northern New South Wales, Queensland and Western Australia)
- Advantage Supermarkets
- Bi-Lo Supermarkets (Western Australia only)
- Cheap Foods Supermarkets
- Dewsons Express Supermarkets – sold to Metcash and rebranded as IGA in 2005.
- Dewsons Supermarkets – sold to Metcash and rebranded as IGA in 2005.
- Foodland Supermarkets – rebranded as Eziway Food Store in 2004. (Western Australia only)
- Four Square Supermarkets – rebranded as Friendly Grocer in 2006 and continues to operate. (Australian Capital Territory, New South Wales, Queensland and Victoria)
- Four Square Supermarkets WA – rebranded as Eziway Food Store in 2004. (Western Australia only)
- Rules Supermarkets
- Supa Valu Supermarkets – sold to Metcash and rebranded as IGA in 2005. Later relaunched as Supa Valu IGA in 2021 under Metcash ownership. (Western Australia only)

==== Permewan Wright Limited ====
Permewan Wright Limited
- Trade name: Permewans
- Formerly: Browne, Osborne & Co. (1854–1861); Permewan & Co. (1861–1869); Permewan Hunt & Co. (1869–1876); Permewan Wright & Co. (1876–1884); Permewan Wright & Co. Limited (1884–1927)
- Type: Public
- Industry: Retail
- Founded: 1854; 172 years ago in Geelong, Australia
- Defunct: Acquired by Composite Buyers in 1986; 40 years ago
- Fate: Acquired by Herosa Nominees Propriatery Limited in 23 June 1976; 50 years ago
- Successor: Payless–Permewan (1976–1986)
- Number of locations: 341 stores List: 237 Permewan Food Store supermarkets; 60 Permewan Country department stores; 23 PDF health food stores; 21 Permewan wholesale clubs; (1970)
- Area served: Australian Capital Territory; New South Wales; South Australia; Tasmania; Victoria
- Owner: Liberman family (1973–1986)
- Subsidiaries: G & G Group (1961–1976); Moran & Cato (1969–1976)

Permewan Wright Limited was the third largest chain of grocery stores in Australia in the mid twentieth century trailing Woolworths and Coles.

The company traces its origins to Browne, Osborne & Co. founded in 1854 in Geelong, Victoria.

By 1893, Permewans had 35 branches in New South Wales and 15 in Victoria including towns such as Trafalgar, Yarragon, Sale, and Bairnsdale in the rural Gippsland region.

By the early 1900s, the company operated 60 branches.

In 1946, Permewan Wright begins retail expansion via food & hardware stores.

G & G Group was taken over by Permewan Wright in 1961 followed by Moran & Cato in 1969.

Prior to the acquisition of Moran & Cato in 1969, Permewan Wright operated a network of 218 stores in addition to 2 factories and 2 warehouses.

- 137 Permewan Food Store supermarkets
- 60 Country department stores (Victoria & New South Wales)
- 21 Permewan warehouse clubs (New South Wales)
- 2 food processing factories (Botany and Newcastle, New South Wales)
- 2 warehouses (Abbotsford, Victoria)

On 23 June 1976, Herosa Nominees Pty Limited took over and subsequently delisted from the Australian Securities Exchange. (Australian Capital Territory, New South Wales, Tasmania, Victoria)

==== Woolworths Limited ====
- Brisbane Cash & Carry BCC – 32 stores (1958) Claud Archibald Fraser opened his first self-service grocery store in 1923. By 1927, there were three BCC stores. BCC stores were acquired by Woolworths Limited in 1958 and rebranded as Woolworths. (Queensland)
- Budget Rite Foodmarkets – discount supermarket chain, acquired by Woolworths in 1990s. (New South Wales and Queensland)
- Cannon Supermarkets – taken over by Woolworths Limited, stores rebranded as Woolworths. (Australian Capital Territory)
- Flemings – one store was in existence and was located in Jannali, Sydney. This store closed in 2020 and moved up the street and into a former IGA store where it trades as Woolworths Metro. (New South Wales)
- Food For Less – chain of supermarkets. The last store was at Beresfield, New South Wales, now rebranded as Woolworths. (New South Wales and Queensland)
- Jack the Slasher Supermarkets – rebranded as Food For Less in the early 1980s. (Queensland, South Australia, New South Wales)
- Macro Wholefoods (New South Wales and Victoria)
- Purity Supermarkets – rebranded as Woolworths in 2002. (Tasmania only)
- Roelf Vos Supermarkets – rebranded as Woolworths in 2002. (Tasmania only)
- Safeway Supermarkets – rebranded as Woolworths between 1985 and 2017.

==== Former independent chains ====
- BBC Supermarket (Western Australia only)
- Big Save Supermarket (Western Australia only)
- Charlie Carters (Western Australia only)

===== Farr’s Market =====
Farr's Market
- Type: Subsidiary
- Industry: Retail
- Founded: 1923; 103 years ago in Newcastle, Australia
- Founder: Mr R. Farr
- Defunct: Last store acquired by G & G Group in 1950; 76 years ago
- Fate: 4 stores acquired by Owl Stores in 1937; 89 years ago
- Headquarters: Newcastle, Australia
- Number of locations: 10 stores (1937)
- Area served: New South Wales
- Parent: Owl Stores Limited

Farr's Market was founded in Newcastle in 1923 by Mr R. Farr.

- Giants Supermarket (Queensland)
- G & G Group

G & G Group
- Formerly: Grocery and General Merchants
- Type: Subsidiary
- Industry: Retail
- Founded: 1933; 93 years ago in Sydney, Australia
- Defunct: 1961; 65 years ago
- Fate: Acquired by Permewan Wright Limited
- Area served: Australian Capital Territory; New South Wales
- Parent: Permewan Wright Limited

- Goodfellows Supermarket
- Half-Case – rebranded as Payless Supermarkets.
- Mity Mart
- Moran & Cato (New South Wales, Tasmania, Victoria)

===== Owl Stores =====
The first Owl Store opened on 27 March 1929 in Gloucester, NSW, pioneering the self-service grocery concept in Australia. Headquartered in Newcastle, by the mid-to-late 1930s the chain grew significantly. It absorbed smaller store networks, acquiring branches in Kempsey, Casino, Lismore, and Glen Innes, taking over Farr's Markets in those towns. At one point, The Owl Stores Ltd. operated around 21 outlets extending through regional NSW, serving coastal and inland communities. Expansion was fueled by acquiring local competitors and adopting self-service retail at a time when most shops still used counter service. By 1938, Owl Stores had consolidated across multiple NSW towns, effectively replacing Farr's Markets in several areas. The chain positioned itself on "low-price" goods, focusing on bulk grocery offerings for everyday shoppers. (Australian Capital Territory, New South Wales)

===== Payless Supermarkets =====
Payless Supermarkets in Australia emerged from Half-Case through rebranding. The Liberman family originated their retail interest by acquiring Australian Payless chain in 1973, alongside Permewan Wright. This combination formed the Payless–Permewan network, which remained under their control until 1986. In 1986, they exited by selling to Composite Buyers, pivoting back to property and diversified investment interests. (Victoria only)

- Rainbow Supermarkets
- Rite-Price (South Australia) – discount stores
- Saveway
- Sims Supermarkets (Victoria)
- Stammers Supermarket – A family owned supermarket chain consisting of 3 supermarkets. (Western Australia)
  - Fremantle (Corner of Wray Avenue and Hampton Road) – now Ellen's Health Medical Centre
  - Palmyra – Rebranded as Woolworths
  - Winthrop – Rebranded as Supa IGA
- Super Q store (Queensland)

===== Tom The Cheap Grocer =====
John Cade – 21 stores, sold to Tom The Cheap Grocer in 1970s. (Western Australia only)

==== Former independent retailers ====
- Betta Value – 1 store, rebranded as IGA. (Charthouse Waikiki, Western Australia)
- Rockingham Factory Outlet – 1 store (United Cinemas complex City of Rockingham, Western Australia)
- Top Valu – 1 store, rebranded as IGA (Maylands, Western Australia)

== French Polynesia ==
- Carrefour
- Géant

== New Zealand ==
=== Current ===
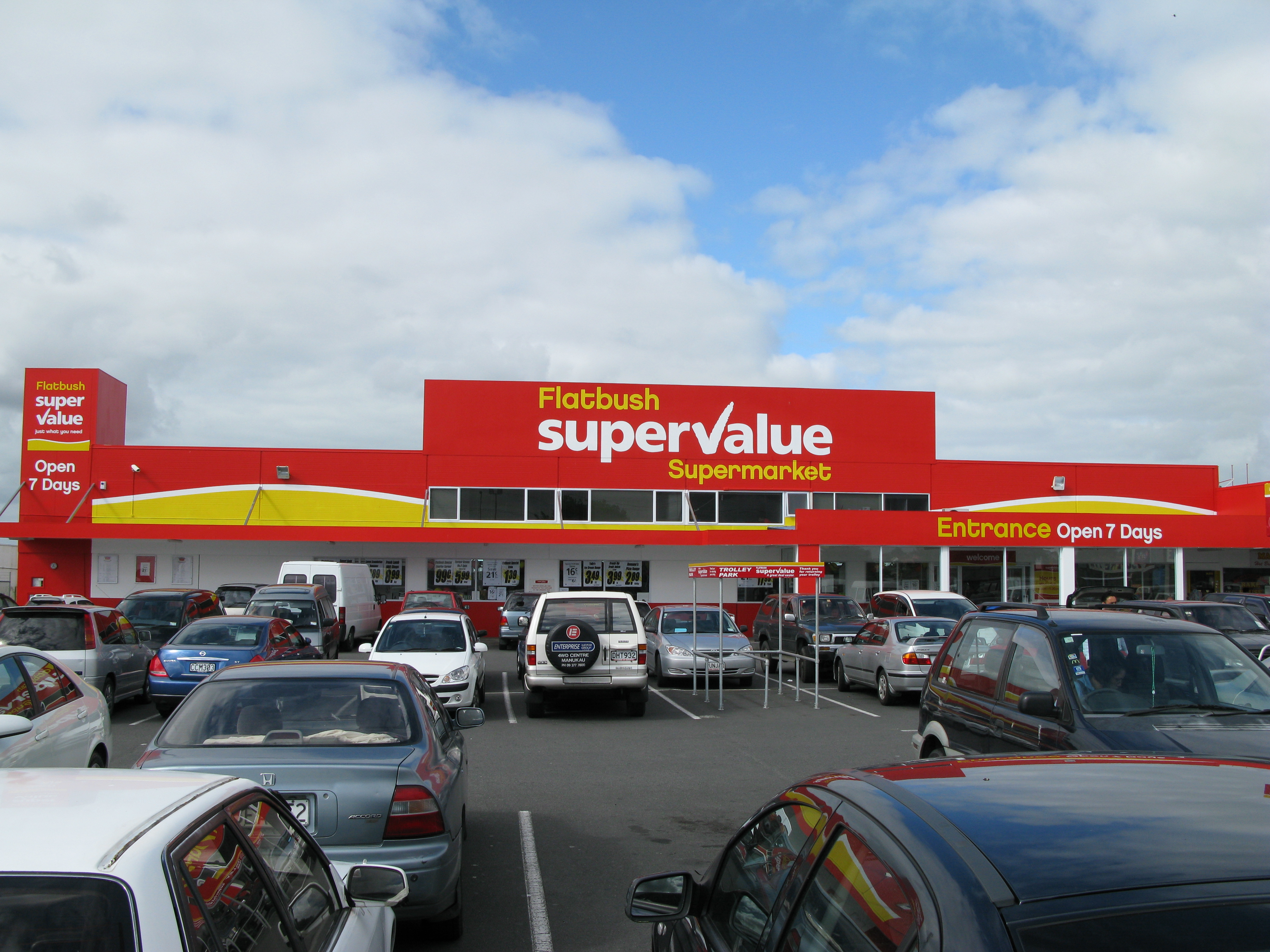
A SuperValue outlet in Flat Bush, Auckland, New Zealand

Supermarket retailing in New Zealand is a duopoly:

- Costco Wholesale – Westgate Auckland (Membership only Access)
- Woolworths (formerly Progressive Enterprises)
  - Woolworths
  - FreshChoice
  - FreshChoice Mini
  - SuperValue
- Foodstuffs
  - Four Square
  - New World
  - Pak'nSave
  - Pak'n'Save Mini

=== Former ===
- Woolworths Limited New Zealand
  - Countdown – The final Countdown Supermarket in Botany Downs was rebranded Woolworths New Zealand on 8 December 2025.
- Progressive Enterprises
  - 3 Guys – rebranded as Countdown
  - Big Fresh – rebranded as Woolworths or Countdown
  - Foodtown – rebranded as Countdown
  - Price Chopper – rebranded as Woolworths or Countdown
  - Write Price – rebranded as Pak'nSave Mini
  - Raeward Fresh – All stores closed as Brand was axed by Foodstuffs South Island.
- The Warehouse – shut down their supermarket sections but continues to sell some food items

== Papua New Guinea ==
- Boroko Food World
- Burns Philp
- JMart
- RH Hyper-Mart
- San Kam Ap (Stores) 1980s
- Stop & Shop
- Stop N Shop – supermarket chain belonging to CPL Group who also own chemist and hardware outlets
- Tango
- TST Supermarkets
- Waterfront Food World
