= Drakes Supermarkets =

Australian supermarket chain

- Formerly: Drakes Supa IGA, Drakes Foodland
- Type: Private
- Industry: Retail
- Founded: 1974; 52 years ago
- Founder: Roger Drake
- Headquarters: Henley Beach Road, Torrensville, South Australia
- Number of locations: 75 stores (2025)
- Area served: South Australia; Queensland
- Key people: Roger Drake, (CEO); John-Paul Drake, (Director)
- Revenue: AU$1.1 billion (2019)
- Number of employees: 5,800+
- Website: www.drakes.com.au

Drakes Supermarkets is a privately owned Australian independent retail chain based in South Australia.

Named after Roger Drake who opened the first store in Mitcham, Adelaide in 1974, Drakes has since expanded to become one of Australia's largest independent supermarket chains, operating 75 stores in South Australia and Queensland. Drakes has an online shopping website which delivers groceries from eight stores in South Australia and one store in Queensland. It also has an online store for corporate platters called "Drakes' Little Site of Platters. This was rebranded to Feed me by Drakes in 2021, feedme.drakes.com.au".

Drakes also operates two newsagencies and five Cellarbrations liquor stores in South Australia.

As of 2013 the company had an annual turnover of AUS $1 billion. The company employs over 5,500 staff nationally and was the largest owner of Foodland stores until it split from the brand in 2019.

== History ==
=== Establishment ===
Drakes Supermarkets began trading in 1974 when Roger Drake, a former Coles/Myer manager, started his own three-aisle supermarket in Mitcham. Known as Jack and Jill's, he bought the store for only $29,000 and employed four people.

That store proved successful and in 1977, he bought his second store at Torrensville. This was his first full-size supermarket.

=== Growth ===
Drake continued to expand his chain. By 2005 he owned 27 Foodland stores in SA as well as 3 Timesavers stores, six Queensland stores, four newsagencies, a liquor outlet and a large property portfolio. This speedy expansion was enabled by the purchase of Davids and Franklins supermarkets in SA as well as the purchase of six Queensland stores between August and October 2004.

In 2006, Drakes obtained a rare exemption from participating in the WorkCoverSA scheme.

In 2013 Drakes announced the development of a new meat processing centre at Beverley in Adelaide, South Australia. The centre, expected to cost $10 million, enabled quality control of Drakes meat products and greater efficiencies. The following year, Drakes' annual turnover reached $1 billion in its 40th year of operation.

In 2014 Drakes bought out Wilson's Fresh Produce based in Rocklea, Brisbane. The company had been its Queensland fruit and vegetable supplier for ten years, a relationship that doubled Wilson's sales. Wilson's was rebranded It's Fresh Queensland and the existing wholesale customers were retained. Earlier, Drakes bought out one of its South Australian fresh produce suppliers to form It's Fresh South Australia. Drakes continues to own It's Fresh.

As at 2018, Drakes Supermarkets turned over $1 billion a year and employed 5,500 people. Roger Drake continues to own the business.

=== Re-branding ===
The majority of Drakes Supermarkets originally operated under Metcash's Foodland, IGA or Supa IGA brands. Other stores operated as Timesavers.

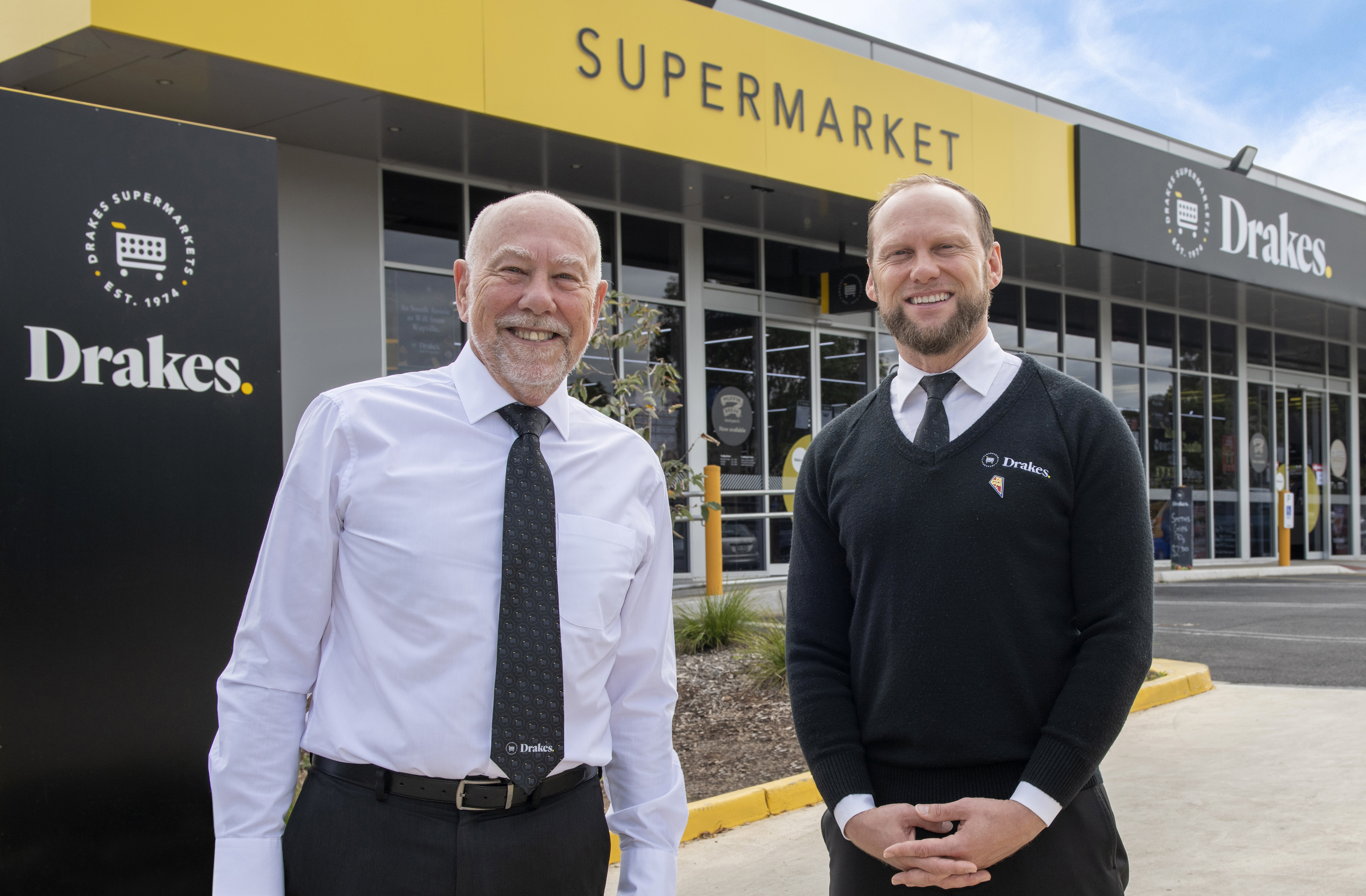
Roger Drake (left) with son John-Paul Drake (right) standing in front of their Wayville, South Australia store

From November 2017, Drake's Queensland Supa IGA stores were rebranded as Drakes. In 2019, all South Australian stores were also rebranded to remove Foodland branding and become Drakes Supermarkets.

=== Drakes distribution centre ===
In May 2018 Drakes Supermarkets announced the building of a new $80 million distribution centre in Adelaide's northern suburbs at Edinburgh North, ending its contract with grocery supplier Metcash in June 2019. Drakes already operated its own fruit and vegetable distribution centre, It's Fresh, in Pooraka and meat distribution centre at Beverley. The new distribution centre will not take over supplying Drakes supermarkets in South Australia until the end of September 2019, and Drakes has a new 5 year contract with Metcash for its Queensland stores. The official opening of the new facility was held on 26 September 2019.

== Store formats ==
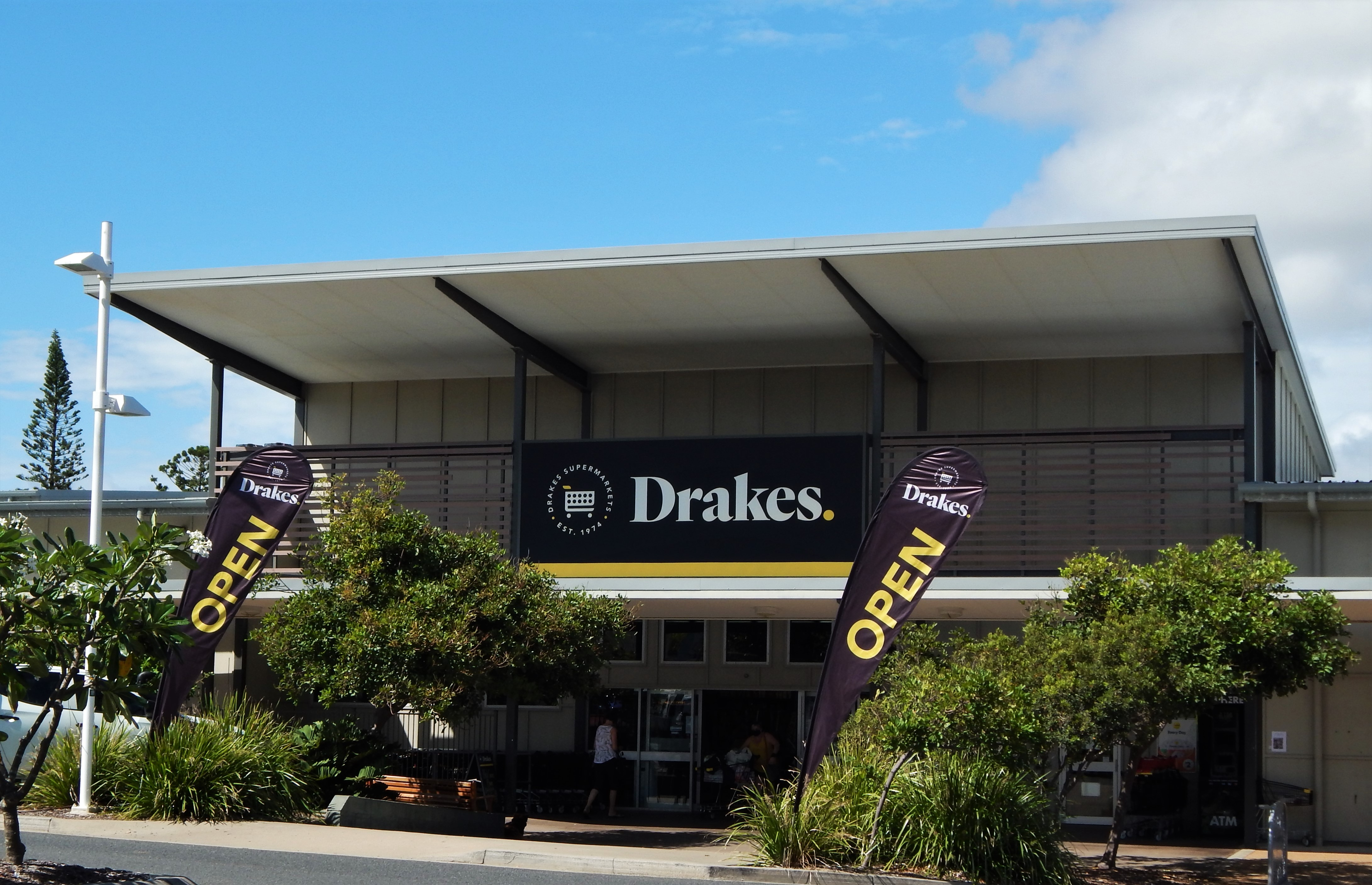
A Drakes Supermarket in Emu Park in 2022

Drakes Supermarkets operates stores in a number of different formats.

=== Standard format ===
The standard Drakes Supermarket is a medium-sized supermarket, slightly smaller than those operated by Coles or Woolworths. These stores stock a broad range of grocery items, fruit and vegetables, bakery goods, meat, frozen and dairy products and delicatessen goods.

=== Market stores ===
In 2015, Drakes opened a Market store format, with one in South Australia, one at Alice Plaza in the Northern Territory, and one in Queensland. These stores are quite small and as such, can take advantage of the longer shopping hours available to smaller stores in South Australia. These stores still stock a wide variety of consumer goods with a focus on organic, vegetarian and vegan food.

=== Fruit sheds ===
Drake's fruit shed opened first in Queensland at Caboolture and Parkinson. South Australia's first fruit shed was set up in the Drake's Foodland at Seaford in Adelaide's south in October 2018. , and second Fruit Shed was set up in the new Murray Bridge store in April 2019. These supermarkets sell imperfect fresh produce at reduced prices.

=== New concept store ===
In 2018, Drakes opened a new concept store at Wayville in South Australia. The store has a completely new layout including popcorn machine, orange juice machine, kombucha taps and hot food available from the service deli. The concept has proven popular, with Collinswood and Salisbury also taking on similar styling as the Wayville store.

== Other operations ==
Drakes Supermarkets operates its own meat centres, at Parkinson in Queensland and Beverley in South Australia. It supplies its own fruit and vegetables through It's Fresh, also in both states.

Drakes operates two newsagencies in Adelaide, as well as five Cellarbrations liquor stores.

== Controversies ==
=== Underpayments ===
Between 2014 and 2020, Drakes Supermarkets underpaid their managerial staff by $1.5 million, which they settled to repay along with $590,000 in penalties and interest. Specifically, Drakes failed to pay their staff for performing overtime work or pay the appropriate penalty rates during hours that attracted such rates, in addition to making unlawful deductions from employee's payslips for the use of mandatory uniform items.

=== Afterpay ===
In 2023, Drakes adopted the Buy now, Pay later service Afterpay across all of its stores, which the South Australian Council of Social Service warned could cause "very dangerous debt traps".

== Community initiatives ==
=== Community Dollars ===
Drakes Supermarkets has a unique community funding programme called Community Dollars. Volunteer organisations that join the programme receive tags to pass on to members who shop at Drakes supermarkets. 1c in every $1 spent at a Drakes store in South Australia and 2c in Queensland is donated to the nominated charity when the tags are presented at checkout. This programme has seen over $500,000 between 2018-2020 donated to non-profit groups across both states.

=== Drakes Charity Showbags ===
Drakes co-operates with suppliers and Bedford Group to annually release the Drakes Charity Showbags in-store during the Royal Adelaide Show. All profits raised are divided between five charities - Bedford Group (Phoenix Society), Royal District Nursing Service, The Queen Elizabeth Hospital Research Foundation, Flinders Medical Centre Breast Cancer Research and St John Ambulance. In 2018-2020, over $250,000 was raised and 47,000 bags sold through this initiative.

== Private labels ==
=== Value ===
A value brand that competes with Woolworths Essentials, Coles Simply, Metcash Black & Gold and Foodworks Best Buy.

== See also ==
- List of supermarket chains in Oceania
