= Franklins =

Defunct Australian supermarket chain

Franklins & Family Supermarkets

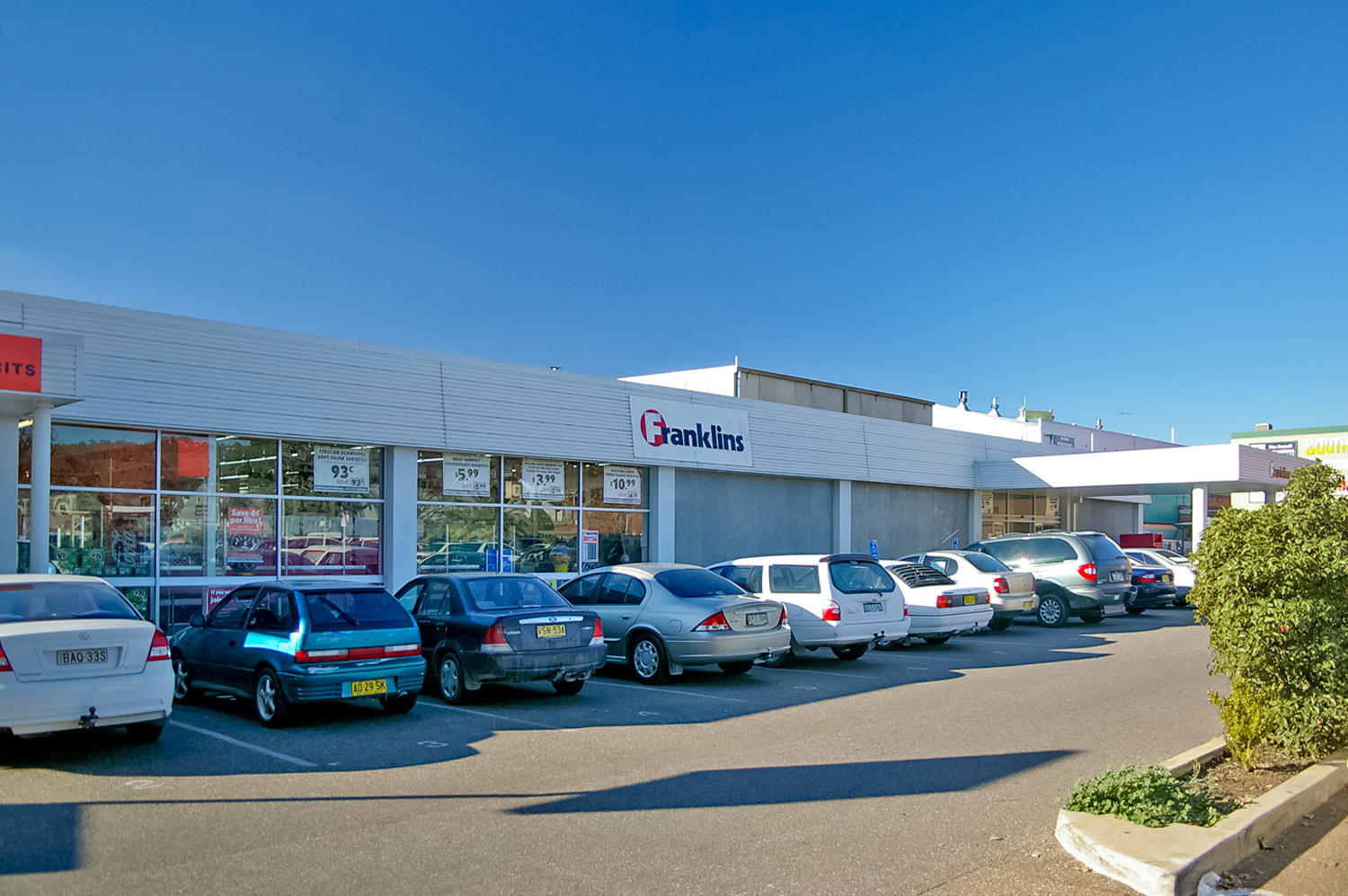
- Former Franklins Supermarket in Wagga Wagga, Australia
- Type: Subsidiary
- Industry: Retail
- Founded: 1941; 85 years ago in Sydney, Australia
- Founder: Frank Lindstrom
- Defunct: 2015; 11 years ago
- Headquarters: Australia
- Number of locations: 287 stores (2000)
- Products: Grocery, perishables
- Parent: Dairy Farm International (1978–2001); Pick 'n Pay (2001–2011); Metcash (2011–2015)
- Website: www.franklins.com.au

Franklins was an Australian discount supermarket chain selling packaged groceries and perishables throughout New South Wales, Queensland, Victoria and South Australia. It sold the "No Frills" home brand generic products. In 2011 the chain was bought by Metcash and the stores were sold off, shut down or converted into new supermarket banners or other brands. The final store closed in April 2015.

== History ==
=== Beginnings (1941–1978) ===
In 1941, Franklins was established in Sydney by Frank August Lindstrom. It was his second supermarket chain, with his first one having been sold to Woolworths. In 1954, Franklins was acquired by Harold Cornock and Norman Tieck. Under their leadership it grew to cover much of New South Wales, and created a reputation for low prices.

=== Early Dairy Farm International (1978–1992) ===
In 1978, Cornock and Tieck sold the then 75-store supermarket chain to Hong Kong company Dairy Farm International, a member of the Jardine Matheson group, which maintained the chain's discount focus. Its turnover was A$1 million. Franklins launched its No Frills generic range of products (store brand). This was the first such range in Australia. The 'No Frills' brand became very important to Franklins as it provided the best value to customers. However, unlike Aldi in Europe, Franklins also retained a wide range of brand items. Franklins' stores outside NSW were branded black-and-white 'Franklins No Frills' to emphasize the label. Eventually the name replaced the white-on-red 'Franklins' in the home state of NSW, until the brand reverted to a red, white and black 'Franklins'. In retaliation, Woolworths later launched "Home Brand" and Coles launched "Scotch Buy" (later rebranded as "Savings"). Around this time, Bi-Lo began operations in Adelaide, using a similar format to Franklins.

In 1982, Franklins expanded outside of Sydney and ultimately New South Wales to open its first stores in Victoria, at Deer Park, Gladstone Park and Glenferrie.

In 1983, Franklins opened its first store in Queensland, at Toowoomba.

In 1989, Franklins opened its first store in South Australia. Franklins also launched FRFM, Franklins' own in-house radio station playing songs and advertising specials.

By 1989, Franklins had also expanded into the ACT, covering the east coast of mainland Australia and South Australia.

=== Late Dairy Farm International (1992–2001) ===
Throughout the 1990s, Dairy Farm International began to introduce new store concepts and branding ideas.

In 1990, Franklins opened attached liquor stores under the brand Liquor Save. Franklins also opened its 200th store the same year.

In 1992, Franklins Big Fresh was launched. This was a "food barn" format Dairy Farm had developed in New Zealand as "Big Fresh". Some existing stores were converted to this format, while others were newly built. These stores featured "outback" or farm style decorations, and animatronic displays which could be activated by customers – including singing chickens and dancing fruit. The first Franklins Big Fresh store opened in Leichhardt, and others were opened in Marrickville, Macquarie Centre, Stockland Glendale and Gosford. The Gosford store featured a unique mini branch of the Commonwealth Bank within the store, as well as a small hairdressing kiosk. The hairdressing kiosk was rolled out to a number of other stores, although not all were the Big Fresh model. At the same time, Franklins started opening a few Mini Fresh stores in Queensland.

In 1994, Franklins launched Franklins Fresh, a mainstream supermarket format. In contrast to "Franklins No Frills" stores, they sold fresh produce, baked goods and meat as well as groceries. The "Fresh" part of the logo was similar to the one used by Big Fresh. It was designed to be a smaller version of Franklins Big Fresh. The first Franklins Fresh store opened in Engadine.

In 1998, Franklins launched its first advertisement on TV with its first slogan, "More in your trolley for less". It also trial converts selected "No Frills" stores to "Franklins Fresh" and installs environmentally friendly fluorescent lighting in these stores. First Choice, an alternative (and short-lived) generic product range, is also launched. Franklins, Franklins Fresh and Franklins Big Fresh also launched their websites that year.

In 1999, Franklins opened new stores and upgraded former No Frills stores to Franklins Fresh stores and unveiled its new logo, which is still used today, though it was only in use at selected stores at first. Also due to the logo change, Franklins Fresh also unveiled a new logo. The "Liquor Save" outlets were also re-branded as Franklins Liquor (attached to selected No Frills and Fresh stores) or Big Fresh Liquor. It had also positioned itself by this time as the national discount supermarket operator.

In 2000, Franklins sponsored the Sydney 2000 Paralympic Games. It sold a range of Paralympic merchandise. By the end of 2000, there were 287 stores.

=== Pick 'n Pay (2001–2010) ===
In 2001, Franklins' mass expansion and reformatting ended in failure. Dairy Farm International exits from Australia in May, and many stores were sold to Woolworths (which got 67 stores), Coles (which got 37 stores), Foodland and IGA franchisees. A few closed. This saw the end of Franklins in the ACT, Queensland, Victoria and South Australia. 53 stores across New South Wales were sold to South African retailer Pick 'n Pay, which also bought the Franklins name. The "No Frills", "Fresh" and "Mini Fresh" brands survived. "Big Fresh" did not and nearly all were bought by Woolworths and Coles. Pick 'n Pay bought all but one of the 21 Fresco supermarkets and rebranded them as Franklins stores at the same time. The other was shut down. The new Franklins launched the "Saves You Money" slogan. In January Aldi launched in NSW, and quickly filled the void left by Franklins in many areas.

In 2002, Foodland Associated Limited bought 45 Franklins stores across Queensland and Northern NSW as well as its Queensland warehouse facilities. All were rebranded as Action supermarkets. This saw the end for the "Mini Fresh" brand. The "Fresh" and "No Frills" brands were also retired, although their formats remained. All stores more than 2000 square metres are effectively "Fresh" stores. Franklins was relaunched with the slogan "Look at us now!".

In 2003, Franklins changed its slogan to "That's what I like about Franklins!". It also announced that it is not interested in owning petrol stations like most of its competitors. Later that year, the "No Frills" generic product range and the brand itself is revamped and then promoted by its new mascot, "Red Sock".

In 2004, the Franklins website was relaunched and Franklins joined the widespread trend of selling green plastic carrier bags. The fourth Pick 'n Pay era slogan was launched – "Cheap and Cheerful". The liquor outlets were relaunched as Franklins Local Liquor, in addition to the Canberra-based liquor chain. The annual "Birthday Cash Jackpot" competition is also introduced.

In 2005, Franklins started setting up franchise opportunities under the "Franklins Family Supermarkets" brand (similar to the "Pick 'n Pay Family Supermarkets" brand). By that time, there were 80 Franklins supermarkets across New South Wales. The only Franklins store to open that year was the one in Newcastle. The Franklins store in Erina Fair on the Central Coast was also closed, soon replaced by Aldi.

On 30 January 2006, Franklins opened a purchased store in Ulladulla NSW to show potential franchisees the benefits of changing from IGA to Franklins. Also in 2006, Franklins launched its own loyalty club and begins changing a few stores to the franchise model. There were 77 Franklins stores by the end of 2006.

In 2007, some new stores were opened. Two existing Franklins stores and another two IGA stores were converted to Franklins Family supermarkets. By the end of 2007 there were 80 Franklins stores.

On 1 July 2010, it was announced that all 85 stores had been sold to Metcash for A$215 million, to become part of the IGA chain. The stores will be sold individually to independent retailers. In April 2015, the last store, located at Westfield Miranda, closed, ending the business after over 74 years of operation

== Operations ==
Previous Franklins Big Fresh, No Frills and Fresh logos.

=== Defunct store formats ===
By the mid-1990s, Franklins supermarkets comprised five main chains:

==== Franklins ====
===== Franklins Big Fresh =====
Full-service food barn/supermarket similar to Coles and Woolworths but pitched as being a bit cheaper. Most of them also had attached "Liquor Save" outlets. Similar chains: Coles, Woolworths, BI-LO Mega Frrresh, Supa IGA, Action.

===== Franklins Fresh =====
Sold fresh food and dry groceries in mid-sized discount supermarkets. Similar chains: BI-LO, Flemings, IGA, Friendly Grocer, Dewsons.

===== Franklins Mini Fresh =====
Sold fresh food and dry groceries in smaller convenience stores. Similar chains: Woolworths Metro, Coles Express (now Coles Central), IGA Express, 4 Square (now Eziway).

===== Franklins No Frills =====
Sold No Frills brand dry groceries and perishables in mid-sized discount supermarkets. Similar chains: Woolworths' Food For Less, Jewel.

==== Liquor Save ====
Bottle shops attached to a supermarket. Similar chains: Woolworths Liquor, IGA Liquor, Liquorland.

== Private label brands ==
=== No Frills ===
No Frills was Franklins' generic range of products. Launched in 1978, it was the first such brand range in Australia, and changed supermarket shopping habits in Australia. Franklins stores initially changed the store's format to revolve around the brand, selling little else. The "No Frills" name was also used up until 2002 for the name of the format Franklins had used which is best known for selling dry groceries and frozen perishables only.

No Frills logo.

Originally, the No Frills brand was only used for its peanut butter, honey and potato chips but has since expanded its range to more than 800 products in packaged groceries and perishables.

=== First Choice ===
Previous Franklins First Choice logo.

First Choice was another generic range of products Franklins had sold. They had over 600 different products, and new products were continually being developed every day. The brand did not survive for long, though, and by the time Dairy Farm International exited the company in 2001, the brand was dropped, unlike No Frills, which continues to be sold at IGAs to this day.

The First Choice brand is still used by Hong Kong supermarket Wellcome.

== Advertising ==
Historically, Franklins never advertised due to it being a "no-frills" supermarket. Instead, it advertised specials at the stores, much like Aldi does now. Later, it advertised through their own catalogues, especially when it introduced fresh foods and liquor to its stores. In the early 1990s Franklins launched its first TV advertisement with the slogans "More in your trolley for less" and "Good ol' Prices are Back". Shortly after Dairy Farm International exited the business in 2001, Franklins' advertisements used the slogan "Saves You Money".

In 2002, the new Franklins was launched with the slogan "Look at us now!". In 2003 it was changed to "That's what I like about Franklins!" and again in 2004 to "Cheap and Cheerful". That slogan is now rarely used, being largely replaced with and branded as "Australia's Original Discount Grocer".

The No Frills generic product range was relaunched in 2003 and promoted by its mascot "Red Sock" on TV advertisements and on its website. "Red Sock" now appears once every so often in the regular advertising on TV, radio, newspapers and catalogues for Franklins. In late 2009 Franklins changed back to the 2002 slogan "Look at us now!".

In 2011 the flash mobbing technique was used with shoppers and employees singing and dancing to the "Franklins Supermarket Spectacular" across their stores to promote Franklins during a time when Coles used their ever-popular "Down, Down, Prices Are Down" advertising campaign and the downwards pointing red hands to promote their sales. Woolworths had also used flash mobbing and became accessible in all states and territories of Australia and during a time when Metcash, owners of the IGA brand – which acquired Franklins the previous year – started converting their stores into the IGA, Foodland network. Drakes Supermarkets took a number of stores in South Australia.

In 2012, the last year of Franklins as a separate chain in its own right, Franklins returned to using the Dairy Farm-era slogans "More in your trolley for less" and "Good ol' Prices are Back" in retro-style promotions alongside its Pick-n-Pay-era "Australia's Original Discount Grocer" slogan. The chain also joined the divisive $1 milk price wars along with Coles, Woolworths, Aldi and some IGA supermarkets. In the brand's final years, it was used in place of the IGA brand as the stores were being sold off. A second "Franklins Rewards" program was launched when only the store in Westfield Miranda remained.
