= Mary Street Bakery =

Australian bakery and cafe chain

Restaurant information
- Established: July 2013
- Owner: Paul Aron
- Previous owner: Michael Forde
- Location: Perth, Western Australia, Australia
- Website: https://www.marystreetbakery.com.au/

Mary Street Bakery is a chain store bakery and cafe located in Western Australia.

== Description ==
The venue has been described as a "Perth institution" by The West Australian. It is well known in Perth's breakfast and brunch scene. Reviewers have said that the baked goods and coffee across each of these venues "tend to be reliably very good".

It is known in part for its breakfast dessert menu. Dishes served include croissant bread and butter pudding, doughnuts with hundreds and thousands. Savoury dishes include the brisket sandwich with Russian dressing, and smoked salmon croquettes and beetroot fritters. The savoury menu was described as "the kind of meal that won’t win a beauty contest: the fritters are fat, red-brown and, well, it’s best not to dwell on what they look like. But the flavours are good, as is the pink hummus they sit on".

== History ==
The chain was founded by Michael Forde and Paul Aron, also known for their cafe chains Tiny's and Offshoot Coffee. The first location was opened in July 2013 on the corner of Beaufort Street and Mary Street in Highgate. It has five locations, in Highgate, West Leederville, QV1, Allendale Square and City Beach.

Mary Street Bakery also supplies bread and pastries to other cafes, restaurants and grocers. Since 2022, the company has supplied products to Coles Local stores in Perth.

In late 2023, the Claremont store was closed.

== Reception ==
In a 2023 review of the opening of the City Beach store, Kate Emery of The West Australian, scored the venue 16/20 writing: "Mary Street is sufficiently well known that it doesn’t need me to sing its praises. But it’s nice to be reminded that the speed with which they have seduced Perth — they’re up to six locations now — doesn’t appear to have come at the cost of turning out an excellent breakfast."

In another earlier review of Mary Street, Kate Emery scored the Highgate store a 'four out of five teacups', after praising its chocolate peanut caramel donut, and the 'morning bun' described as a mix between a cinnamon scroll, an escargot, and an almond croissant. The long macciato was also praised.

Reviewing the cafe for the Sydney Morning Herald's Good Food in 2025, Max Veenhuyzen rated it 14/20 and called its steak sandwich "first-class".

== See also ==
- List of bakeries
- List of brand name breads
- List of restaurant chains in Australia
