= Friendly Grocer =

Australian supermarket chain

- Formerly: Four Square
- Company type: Subsidiary
- Industry: Retail
- Founded: 1923; 103 years ago
- Headquarters: Crestmead, Queensland, Australia
- Number of locations: 215 stores (2025)
- Key people: Steven Baranowski GM
- Products: Grocery store
- Parent: Four Square Stores Queensland LTD
- Website: http://www.friendlygrocer.com.au/

Friendly Grocer (formerly known as Four Square) is a small supermarket banner operating in Australia. The banner was founded in New Zealand in 1923 and expanded to Australia in 1956. Since the success of Four Square the 'Friendly Grocer' brand was introduced in 2006.

There are over 450 stores in Queensland, New South Wales, Australian Capital Territory, Victoria, Tasmania and South Australia. Its current slogan is "Just around the corner". Its main competitors are IGA, FoodWorks, Foodland, Drakes Supermarkets, Spar Australia and many other small supermarket chains.

== Products ==
Friendly Grocer sells groceries and general products. IGA is the closest competitor to Friendly Grocer. In 2006 Friendly Grocer signed an agreement with Metcash/IGA Distribution to supply IGA home branded groceries in every store across the country. With this agreement, Four Square was given a licence to use the Friendly Grocer brand for Queensland and management rights in New South Wales and Australian Capital Territory stores. IGA's main "home brand" is Black and Gold, a generic food brand which also sells in FoodWorks stores across the country. Items are very well known because of the gold/yellow packaging with the black writing on the item.

== See also ==
- List of supermarket chains in Oceania
