= Coles Local =

Australian grocery store chain owned by Coles Group

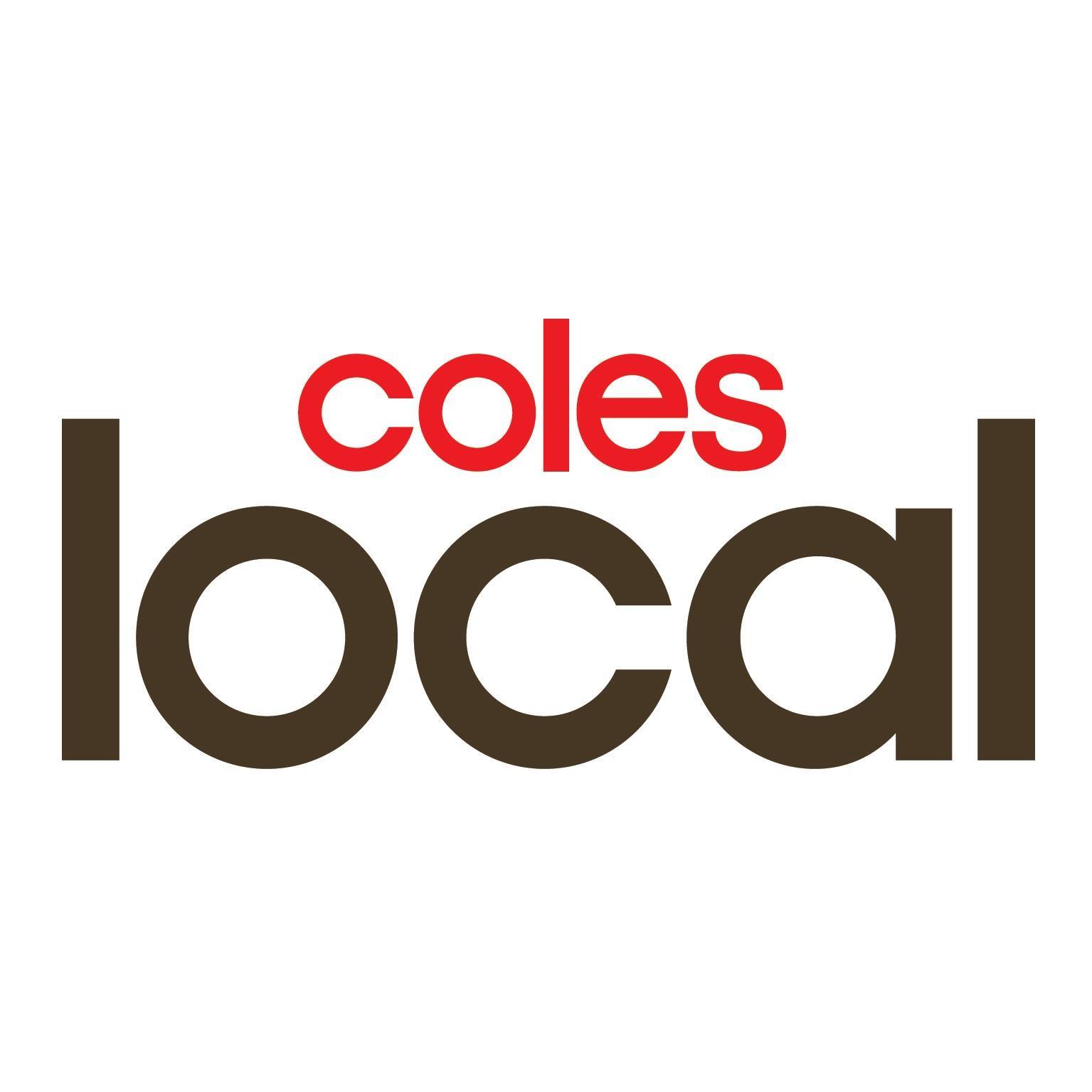
- Trade name: Coles Supermarkets
- Industry: Retail
- Founded: November 2018; 7 years ago
- Headquarters: Hawthorn East, Victoria, Australia
- Number of locations: 34 stores (2026)
- Area served: Victoria; New South Wales; Queensland; Western Australia; South Australia
- Parent: Coles Group
- Website: www.coles.com.au/about/our-businesses/coles-local

Coles Local is the small format brand of Coles Supermarkets in Australia, with the first store opening in November 2018 in Surrey Hills, Victoria.

It has stores that range premium products from local suppliers as well as the essentials of larger Coles stores. Unique store design elements include artwork and murals drawn by local artists.

It has since expanded to twenty-seven sites in Victoria, New South Wales, Queensland and Western Australia. This includes the Balwyn North store, which opened in 1960 and was the site of the first Coles supermarket in Australia (but not the first Coles store, which opened in Collingwood in April 1914).

Coles Local competes with Aldi Corner Store, FoodWorks Local, Friendly Grocer, IGA Local Grocer, SPAR and Woolworths Metro.
