= Festival IGA Supermarkets =

Former Australian supermarket

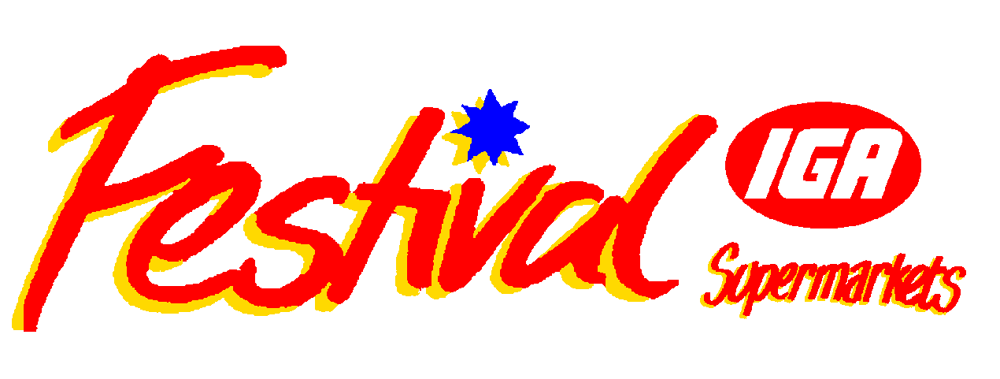
- Logo used from 1992 to 2009
- Company type: Subsidiary
- Industry: Retail
- Founded: 1992; 34 years ago
- Defunct: 1999; 27 years ago
- Fate: Rebranded to IGA
- Number of locations: 16 stores (1999)
- Area served: Australian Capital Territory; New South Wales
- Parent: Metcash

Festival IGA Supermarkets (also known as Festival Supermarkets or Festival IGA) was a branding name for IGA.

== History ==
The name was launched in June 1992 in Victoria by Davids Holdings (now known as Metcash). The first Festival IGA supermarkets were launched in Canberra on 26 October 1992 in Hackett, Lyneham, Florey, Charnwood, Kingston and Hawker.

Within 1995, more Festival IGA Supermarkets were opened throughout Canberra and New South Wales: Deakin, Richardson, Kaleen, Jindabyne, Tumut, Merimbula, Moruya, Batemans Bay, Ainslie and Wanniassa.

By 1999, the Festival brand had disappeared and was renamed under the IGA banner. However, the IGA Supermarkets in Tasmania kept the Festival branding until at least 2012.

== Slogans ==
- "Best and Fresh and Costs you Less"
- "The Friendly sized supermarket"

== Logo ==
The logo for Festival IGA was the wording "Festival" in a red font with yellow shadowing in the background and there was a blue star on top of the "I".
