= Jewel Food Stores (Australia) =

Former Australian supermarket chain

Jewel Food Stores Pty Ltd
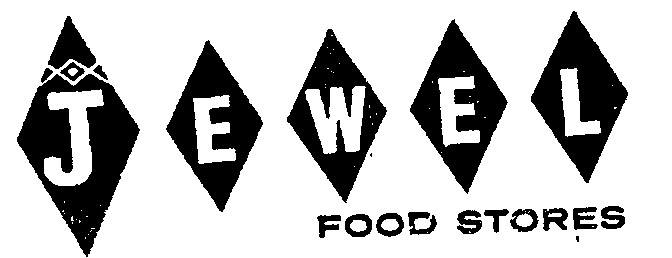
- Logo used from 1970 to 2008
- Formerly: Warmans (1920–1970)
- Type: Subsidiary
- Industry: Retail
- Founded: 1970; 56 years ago
- Founder: Jim Fleming Jr.
- Defunct: 2008; 18 years ago
- Fate: Rebranded to IGA
- Number of locations: 130 stores (1998)
- Brands: No Name
- Parent: Metcash

Jewel Food Stores was an Australian discount supermarket. It operated from 1960 to 1998 with the final stores being absorbed into the Metcash owned IGA branding. The chain was originally owned and operated by the Fleming family. It was not related to the Jewel supermarket chain in the United States.

== History ==
The Fleming family sold their Sydney-based Flemings supermarkets chain to Woolworths in June 1960. They continued operating that chain through Woolworths for the next 10 years. In 1970 they acquired the 42-store Warmans grocery chain and relaunched it as a discount supermarket under the "Jewel Food Stores" name.

In 1995, Jewel Food Stores Pty Ltd was acquired by Davids Holdings that later became Metcash Trading Ltd. In 1998 Davids sold 130 Jewel supermarkets to Independent Retailers for about $100 million. A number of stores closed. The Jewel name disappeared almost entirely when the Independent Retailers rationalised their 29 different grocery banners to form one, Independent Grocers of Australia (IGA). A handful of stores retained the branding beyond the rationalisation. These included a Jewel branded store in Sunshine, Victoria until 2000, and one in Lalor Park which retained the Jewel branding until 2008.

== Operations ==
=== Defunct store formats ===
==== Jewel Country Fresh ====
In the early 1990s, Jewel launched Jewel Country Fresh in response to Franklins and Bi-Lo launching market-style full-line discount supermarkets. These formats carried not only dry groceries and frozen foods, but also fresh foods in a market-style environment.

==== Jewel Food Barn ====
Jewel was credited with bringing the food barn concept to Australia through the Jewel Food Barn format, which sold dry groceries and frozen foods only. The stores had a downmarket look similar to its major rival Franklins, another discount supermarket chain based and established in Sydney. To a lesser extent, it also competed with the Newcastle-based Shoeys discount supermarkets, later to be taken over by BI-LO from South Australia.

==== Jewel Food Stores ====
Jewel was pitched as a low-price supermarket chain similar to Flemings. While Jewel found limited success in New South Wales against long-time incumbent Franklins, new stores in Victoria opened before Franklins and found success there.

==== Rainbow ====
Jewel acquired the Rainbow supermarket in Doonside, Western Sydney.

==== Warmans ====
Warmans
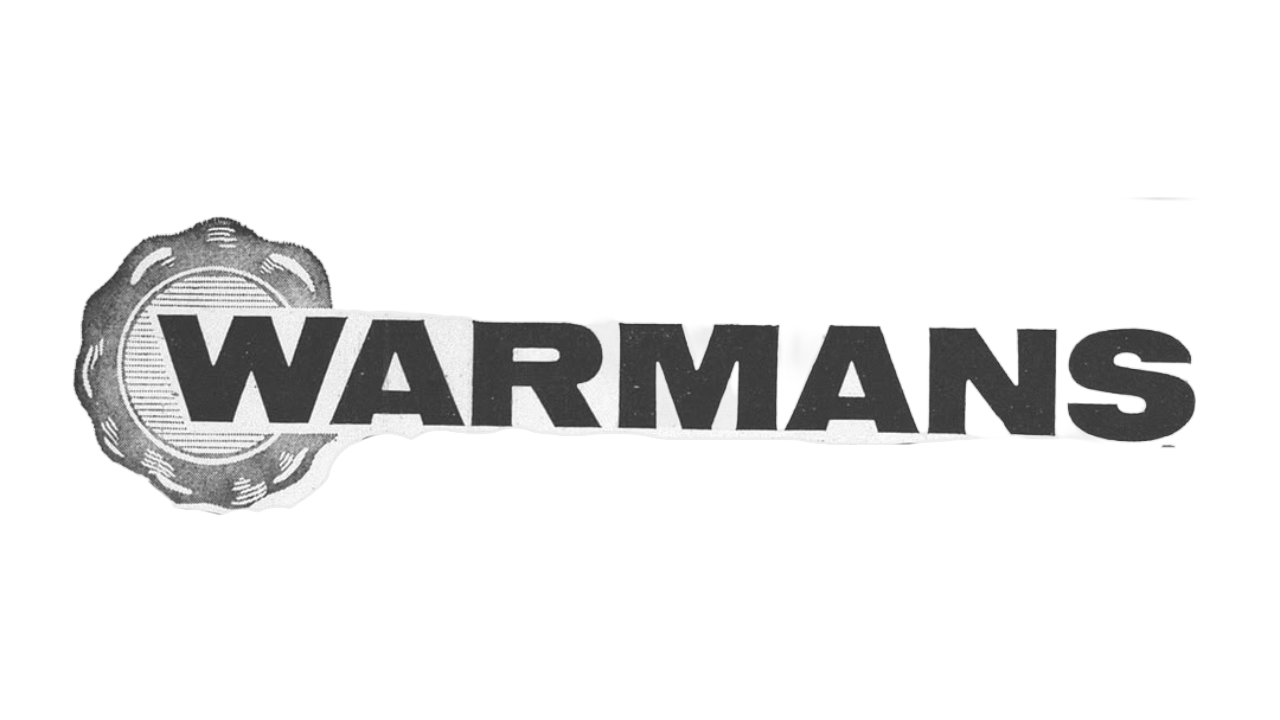
- Logo used from 1920s to 1970
- Industry: Retail
- Defunct: 1970; 56 years ago
- Fate: Rebranded to Jewel Food Stores
- Headquarters: Concord, New South Wales, Australia
- Number of locations: 42 stores (1970)

Warmans was an Australian grocery chain founded in Concord, New South Wales in 1920s.

The chain operated 42 stores in 1970 when Jim Fleming Jr. acquired the chain, subsequently rebranding it as a discount supermarket under the "Jewel Food Stores" name.

== Private label brands ==
The generic product range was called "No Name".

== Advertising ==
As it was a discount supermarket, Jewel usually only advertised specials in-store, rather than advertise the specials everywhere. However, in 1995, Jewel did have an advertising campaign, emphasising on its low-price positioning. This was in the same year that the Fleming family sold the 130 Jewel supermarkets to what is now Metcash (then Davids).

== See also ==
- Flemings
- IGA
