= Jewel Food =

Jewel Food may refer to:

- Jewel (supermarket), an American grocery store chain
- Jewel Food Stores (Australia), an Australian supermarket chain
