= Sims Supermarket =

Former Australian supermarket chain

- Company type: Private
- Industry: Retail
- Founded: 1930; 96 years ago
- Founder: Sims family
- Defunct: 2019; 7 years ago
- Number of locations: 16 stores
- Owner: Sims family (1930-2017)
- Parent: Scroeder family (2017-2019); Reddrop Management Group (since 2019)

Sims Supermarket was a chain of independent supermarkets across the western suburbs of Melbourne, Australia.

== History ==
Sims Supermarkets were the first location in Australia to use barcodes, starting in 1979. Over the years stores were branded as SSW, Payless, Tuckerbag, Foodworks and IGA, amongst others. The Sims stores were owned and operated by the Sims family until going into administration and later being sold in 2017, and formerly were part of various buying groups. After going into administration, the remaining West Footscray and Werribee stores were bought by Scroeder Family Supermarkets in 2017. However, the Werribee store was later sold to Reddrop Management Group, who own multiple Melbourne independent supermarkets, in 2019. The West Footscray store has also since been renovated and is no longer operating as a Sims.

== Operations ==
Sims Supermarket stores were previously located in Altona North, Deer Park, Glenroy, Lalor, Melton, North Melbourne, Pascoe Vale South, Sunshine, Hoppers Crossing, Thomastown, West Footscray, Werribee, Yarraville and Geelong West.

Sims IGA stores were located in Lilydale and Blackburn North but were turned into IGAs. The one in Lilydale suffered foot traffic problems and was turned into a FoodWorks then closed down, closing down almost the entire shopping strip which was afterwards sold to Bunnings.
