= Ritchies Stores =

Australian supermarket chain

- Type: Private
- Industry: Retail
- Founded: 1870; 156 years ago in Frankston, Victoria, Australia
- Founder: Thomas Ritchie
- Headquarters: Carrum Downs, Victoria, Australia
- Number of locations: 156 stores (2025)
- Area served: Victoria; New South Wales; Queensland
- Key people: Fred Harrison, CEO
- Revenue: A$1.4 billion (2024)
- Number of employees: 6,500
- Website: www.ritchies.com.au

Ritchies is the largest independent supermarket chain in Australia, owned by a group of private investors, including Metcash, the owner of the IGA brand. It is also known as "Ritchies Supa IGA". The majority of its stores are located throughout Victoria. Ritchies annual revenue is estimated to be approximately $1.4 billion.

== History ==
Ritchies Stores were founded in 1870 by Thomas Ritchie after surviving the shipwrecked Isabella Watson, the first store opening up in Frankston, Victoria on what is now Nepean Highway.

In 2020, Ritchies' profits doubled over the previous year, following their promotion for consumers to choose local and neighbourhood stores over supermarkets in large shopping centres during the coronavirus pandemic. In 2009 Ritchies was ranked the 20th largest Australian retailer.

== Loyalty schemes ==
Ritchies maintains a loyalty program, in which customers nominate a club, school or charity, and the company donates a percentage of the total spend to the customer's nominated organization each time the customer shopped within their stores. As of December 2012, Ritchies had donated over $40 million under the program.

Ritchies also offers a discount at participating BP or United service stations when transactions of over $25 are conducted in-store.

== See also ==
- List of oldest companies in Australia
