= Food For Less =

Former Australian discount supermarket chain

- Food For Less logo
- Formerly: Jack the Slasher Supermarkets
- Type: Subsidiary
- Industry: Retail
- Founded: 1980; 46 years ago
- Defunct: 2019; 7 years ago
- Headquarters: Australia
- Parent: Woolworths Group
- Website: www.woolworths.com.au

Food For Less was an Australian discount supermarket chain owned by Woolworths Group.

== History ==
It was established in Queensland, where a discount food barn chain operating as Jack the Slasher was acquired by Safeway and when Woolworths took over Safeway in 1990, the stores were positioned as low-cost locations that sold dry groceries and frozen perishables.

It later expanded into New South Wales and became the low-cost supermarket chain for Woolworths, competing with Franklins No Frills, Coles Myer's Bi-Lo and Aldi. The chain expanded when Woolworths purchased the Franklins stores in New South Wales and Queensland, and converted them to the Food For Less brand.

In 2010 Woolworths began to shut down the brand. The stores were either converted into regular Woolworths stores or closed. By 2019 the shutdown was complete and no more Food For Less stores exist. The market niche that Food For Less operated in was also filled by Aldi, which started business in 2001 and had 565 stores in Australia by 2019.

== Operations ==
The store in Port Macquarie, NSW closed on 5 April 2012, with the building earmarked for demolition in 2017. Hurstville NSW closed its doors in November 2015. Maryborough QLD closed its doors in November 2016. The store in Beresfield, NSW has since gone through a renewal and refurbishment and The Food for Less signs were taken down and current Woolworths signs put up in their place in 2018. The store at Roselands NSW closed in August 2018.

== See also ==
- Food-4-Less—US chain owned by Kroger
