= Moran & Cato =

Former Australian supermarket chain

- Type: Subsidiary
- Industry: Retail
- Founded: 1881; 145 years ago
- Founder: Thomas Edwin Moran; Frederick John Cato
- Defunct: 1969; 57 years ago
- Fate: Acquired by Permewan Wright Limited
- Headquarters: Melbourne, Australia
- Number of locations: 164 stores (1969)
- Area served: New South Wales, Tasmania, Victoria
- Products: Groceries
- Number of employees: 1,000 (1935)
- Parent: Permewan Wright Limited

Moran & Cato was the largest chain of grocery stores in Australia in the late nineteenth and early twentieth century.

== History ==
The business began in Melbourne on 24 July 1882 when Frederick John Cato joined his cousin Thomas Edwin Moran, who at the time operated two grocery stores in Fitzroy and Carlton. Moran invited Cato to invest in and manage the expanding business, pooling their combined capital of £411. The partnership flourished. Moran’s sudden death in 1890 at the age of 39 saw his widow step in as partner alongside Cato, who assumed a greater leadership role.

The following decades brought rapid expansion, with the company establishing branches across Victoria, moving into Tasmania, and launching operations in New South Wales. In 1909, a Sydney-based subsidiary was formed to aid interstate growth. In 1912, the firm incorporated as a proprietary company, with Cato as governing director.

In 1935, Moran & Cato employed nearly one thousand people and operated around 120 branches in Victoria and Tasmania, plus about 40 in New South Wales. It remained Australia’s largest independent retail grocery chain and wholesaler well into the mid-twentieth century, competing directly with Coles and Woolworths. Between 1957 and 1961, the company modernised most of its stores to the new self-service model that was transforming grocery retail.

== Acquisition ==
In 1969, Moran & Cato was taken over by rival Permewan Wright Limited for A$11.6 million, equivalent to about A$170.2 million in 2024, marking the end of the brand’s presence in the Australian retail landscape.
