= Plants Plus =

- Type: Private limited company
- Industry: Agribusiness
- Headquarters: Melbourne, Australia
- Area served: Australia
- Key people: Graham Stoneman
- Website: www.plantsplus.com.au

Plants Plus is an Australian marketing and buying group operated on behalf of independently owned garden centres, with 75 member nurseries across the country. Each member nursery pays an annual fee for membership. In return, they trade under the Plants Plus banner, sell Plants Plus branded garden products and participate in group purchasing and marketing schemes. They recently acquired Rivers of Yarrambat under a private sale in July 2026.

== History ==
The Nurserymen logo.

Plants Plus was established in 1978 in Melbourne, Australia as the Retail Nurserymens' Products Co-operative Limited, which traded under The Nurserymen brand. The group's motto was "Your Plant Professionals". In September 1991, the Plants Plus brand was developed and replaced The Nurserymen. A new circular logo was devised which continued the use of a tree motif developed for The Nurserymen brand. The Plants Plus motto was "Knowledge. Advice. Quality".

The Plants Plus logo, 1992-2000.

In 1995, John Danks & Son acquired the Plants Plus brand and the Retail Nurserymens Products Co-operative Limited was subsequently dissolved. By 2000, the group had expanded into all Australian states and the Australian Capital Territory.

The current pink and green logo device was developed for Plants Plus in 2002.

== Publications ==
The Nurserymen published a 40-page monthly magazine called The Nurserymen which was issued free to customers. The magazine featured commissioned articles, product advertisements and group promotional information. In September 1991, the magazine was renamed Plants Plus (Vol. 13, No. 1) to reflect the re-branding of the group. In February 1995, the magazine became Plants Plus Garden Living (Vol. 16, No. 6). Publication of a free magazine ceased in July 1996. Plants Plus publish a subscriber-based quarterly magazine, Gardening Days.

== See also ==
- Gardening in Australia
