= Liberman family =

Australian business family

The Liberman family is an Australian business family primarily based in Melbourne, Victoria.

They are known for their high net worth and business interests, and are associated with property development. The initial wealth of the family was built through commercial property developments under the late patriarch Jack Liberman. They continue to be involved in property financing.

The Liberman family are notoriously private.

== Description ==
Jack and his brother Chaim were Jewish migrants to Australia, having arrived after World War II. When Jack died in 1997 he left behind a fortune; including a retail chain, forklift business, and hosiery manufacturer. Afterwards, the next patriarch of the family Boris Liberman diversified the family assets with investments in various biotech and pharmaceutical firms, as well as equities on the Tel Aviv Stock Exchange.

Their business includes real-estate financing through a firm backed by the family named Monark Property Partners.

In 2013, they were noted by the Sydney Morning Herald as among the top five wealthiest families in Australia. In 2017 they purchased the Beach Hotel in Byron Bay, and were involved in developing the Sydney Four Points by Sheraton.

In 2021, it was reported that the family had a public falling out with another major Australian dynasty, the Grollo family.

== Noteworthy members ==
Some of the more noteworthy members of the family include:

- Jack Liberman - deceased, founding patriarch
- Boris Liberman - patriarch following Jack's death
- Justin Liberman - head of the Jagen family investment firm.
- Berry Liberman - granddaughter of Jack, fund manager at an impact investment firm
- Josh Liberman - manager of a family office associated with the Libermans

== See also ==
- Valmorbida family
