= Flemings (supermarkets) =

Australian supermarket chain

Flemings Food Stores
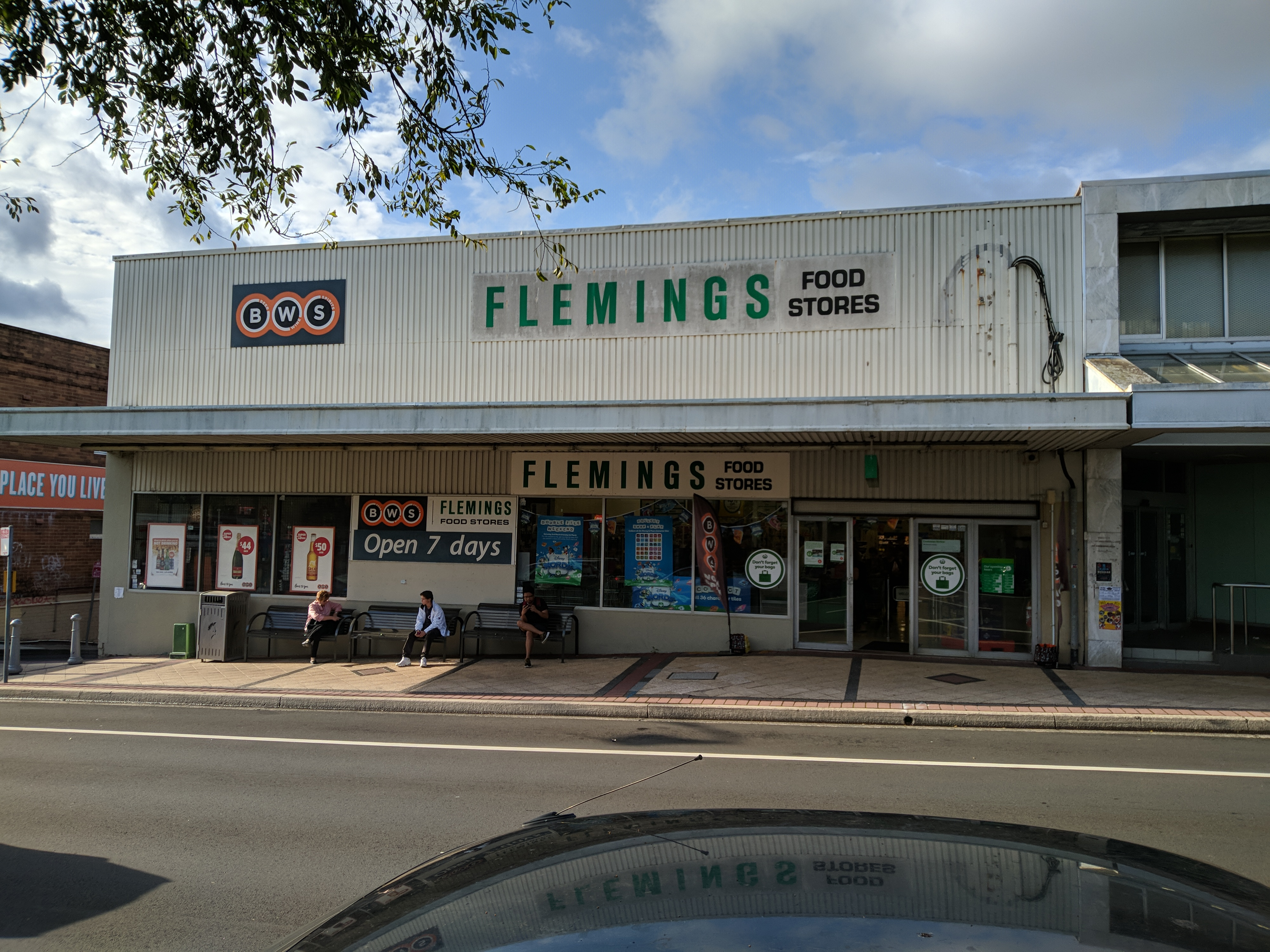
- The last Flemings store in Jannali, 2019
- Type: Subsidiary
- Industry: Retail
- Founded: 1930; 96 years ago
- Founder: Jim Fleming Sr.; George Fleming
- Defunct: 19 May 2020; 6 years ago
- Fate: Acquired by Woolworths Group
- Headquarters: Australia
- Number of locations: 100 (1945)
- Parent: Woolworths Limited

Flemings was a chain of discount supermarkets in Sydney, Australia and surrounding areas.

The first Flemings stores were opened in 1930 by Jim Fleming Sr. and George Fleming. They initially traded under the name "E.L. Lakin". Following World War II, the name changed to "Fleming's Fabulous Food Stores" and there were 100 stores.

In June 1960, Jim Fleming Jr. and his father sold their 55 Flemings stores to Woolworths Limited for $10 million. In the early 1970s, Jim Fleming Jr. acquired Warman's Stores in New South Wales. Fleming gave it a new name, Jewel Food Stores, and pushed it into the same discount end of the grocery retailing business as Flemings.

From the late 1990s, Flemings stores were internally rebranded to Woolworths featuring the same marketing materials and the same home brand products. The external branding didn't change until the late 2000s. Some Flemings stores closed and the remaining were rebranded as Woolworths or Woolworths Metro. The last of these were the Pendle Hill store which was refurbished and rebranded Woolworths in late 2009. Umina Beach on the Central Coast closed on 17 June 2010 and was replaced by a Woolworths, opposite the old Flemings store. The Bexley North store was rebadged as a Woolworths Metro store in 2017. The last Flemings store in Jannali closed on 19 May 2020 and was replaced by a Woolworths Metro.

== See also ==
- Woolworths, the supermarket chain that replaced Flemings
- Woolworths Limited
- Jewel Food Stores
