= Bi-Lo (Australia) =

Former supermarket chain in Australia

Bi-Lo Supermarkets

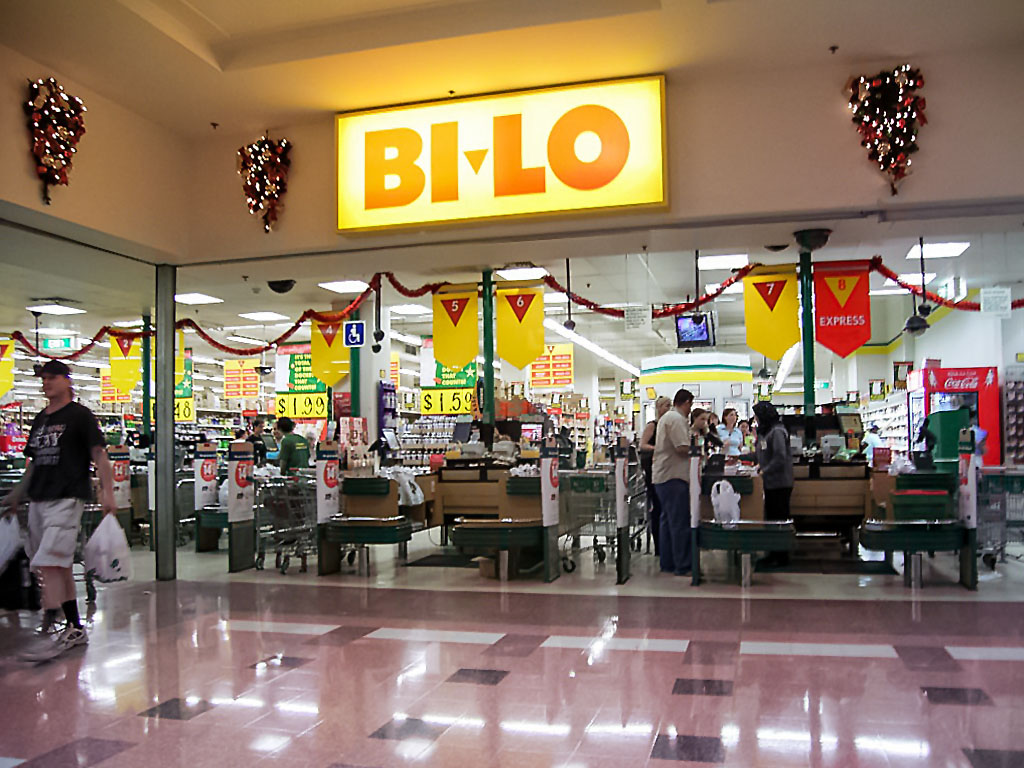
- A former Bi-Lo supermarket in Glebe, Australia at the Broadway Shopping Centre
- Type: Subsidiary
- Industry: Retail
- Founded: 1979; 47 years ago
- Founder: John Weeks
- Defunct: 2017; 9 years ago
- Fate: Rebranded as Coles Supermarkets
- Headquarters: Brisbane, Queensland, Australia
- Number of locations: 180 stores (2006)
- Number of employees: 13,600 (2006)
- Parent: Wesfarmers

Bi-Lo was an Australian discount supermarket chain owned by Wesfarmers. Bi-Lo once had 180 outlets. From 2006, its stores were progressively rebranded as Coles supermarkets or closed. On 30 June 2017, the final store in Shailer Park, Queensland, closed.

== History ==
Bi-Lo was established by John, Peter and David Weeks in South Australia in 1979. The first stores opened at Stirling and Aldgate in South Australia's Adelaide Hills region after being converted from hardware outlets. They were followed by the acquisition of a third store at Murray Bridge. Coles Myer stated that by 1979, Bi-Lo was South Australia's cheapest grocer.

Bi-Lo was a leader in adopting new technology and, by 1983, operated product scanning systems in all its stores, making it the first grocery chain in Australia to have scanning across all its stores.

In 1987, when Bi-Lo was operating 28 supermarkets in South Australia and generating one-third of metropolitan Adelaide's supermarket sales, it was acquired by Coles Myer, which also purchased the 34-store Shoeys discount supermarket chain in New South Wales; Shoeys was subsequently rebranded as Bi-Lo. Bi-Lo later expanded into Queensland and Victoria.

In December 1994, Bi-Lo opened its first Mega Fresh store at Greenacres, South Australia, in response to its then chief competitor Franklins' "Big Fresh" concept. In 1996, Bi-Lo acquired six Newmart supermarkets in Western Australia, although the Newmart name was retained because of its strong brand recognition and the existence of an unrelated chain of the same name. In 1998, Bi-Lo purchased three Northern Territory supermarkets in Darwin and Alice Springs.

Bi-Lo and Newmart opened nine new stores and completed 23 refurbishments in 2000, and opened 26 more stores and completed 11 refurbishments in 2001. The last Newmart stores in Western Australia to open before the chain was absorbed into Coles Supermarkets were at Garden City, Booragoon (October 2000), and Ocean Keys, Clarkson (July 2001). The Newmart stores at Garden City, Collie, Stirling Central, Noranda and Ocean Keys all became Action Supermarkets outlets and later became Woolworths outlets.

In 2002, Bi-Lo acquired and converted 15 Franklins sites in New South Wales (Warilla Grove; Campbelltown – now Coles; Hillsdale – closed in 2003; Mount Druitt – closed in 2005; Shellharbour; Lavington; Thirroul), Queensland (Kawana; Capalaba – closed in 2007 and reopened as Coles in 2008; Hope Island; Loganholme), Victoria (Southland; Waverley Gardens – closed in 2004; Lalor; Broadmeadows) and South Australia (Unley – closed in 2005). Around 820 former Franklins employees were offered positions at Bi-Lo. Bi-Lo also opened seven stores and a Bi-Lo Discount Petrol site at Narrandera, New South Wales. In August that year, all Newmart supermarkets operated by Bi-Lo in Western Australia were transferred to the management of Coles Supermarkets. One Newmart supermarket in Bentley, Western Australia, was rebadged as Coles and subsequently closed in September 2017.

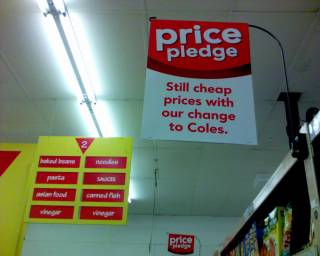
In-store signage promoting the Coles rebrand

In 2003, Bi-Lo relaunched with the slogan "Why Pay More".

In July 2006, Coles Myer CEO John Fletcher announced a strategy to progressively rebrand Bi-Lo, Kmart, First Choice Liquor, Liquorland and Theo's under the Coles banner. Bi-Lo supermarkets were to be rebranded as Coles supermarkets, with others changing to other Coles Group businesses. Coles planned to keep some Bi-Lo lines in its rebranded stores. Rebranding Bi-Lo stores began later in 2006 and had been expected to be completed by mid-2007. A small number of stores were to be rebranded as Coles Discount Grocery where a Coles supermarket already existed in the same complex (for example, at Westfield Fountain Gate). However, Northcote Shopping Centre has two Coles supermarkets in close proximity, both occupying former Bi-Lo sites and remaining in operation.

Some stores, such as Bi-Lo Arkaba in South Australia, were originally Coles supermarkets before being rebranded as Bi-Lo in the late 1990s. Some Bi-Lo stores were rebranded as Coles supermarkets despite a Coles supermarket already operating in the same shopping centre; examples include Northcote Plaza and Ingle Farm Shopping Centre, each of which has two Coles stores.

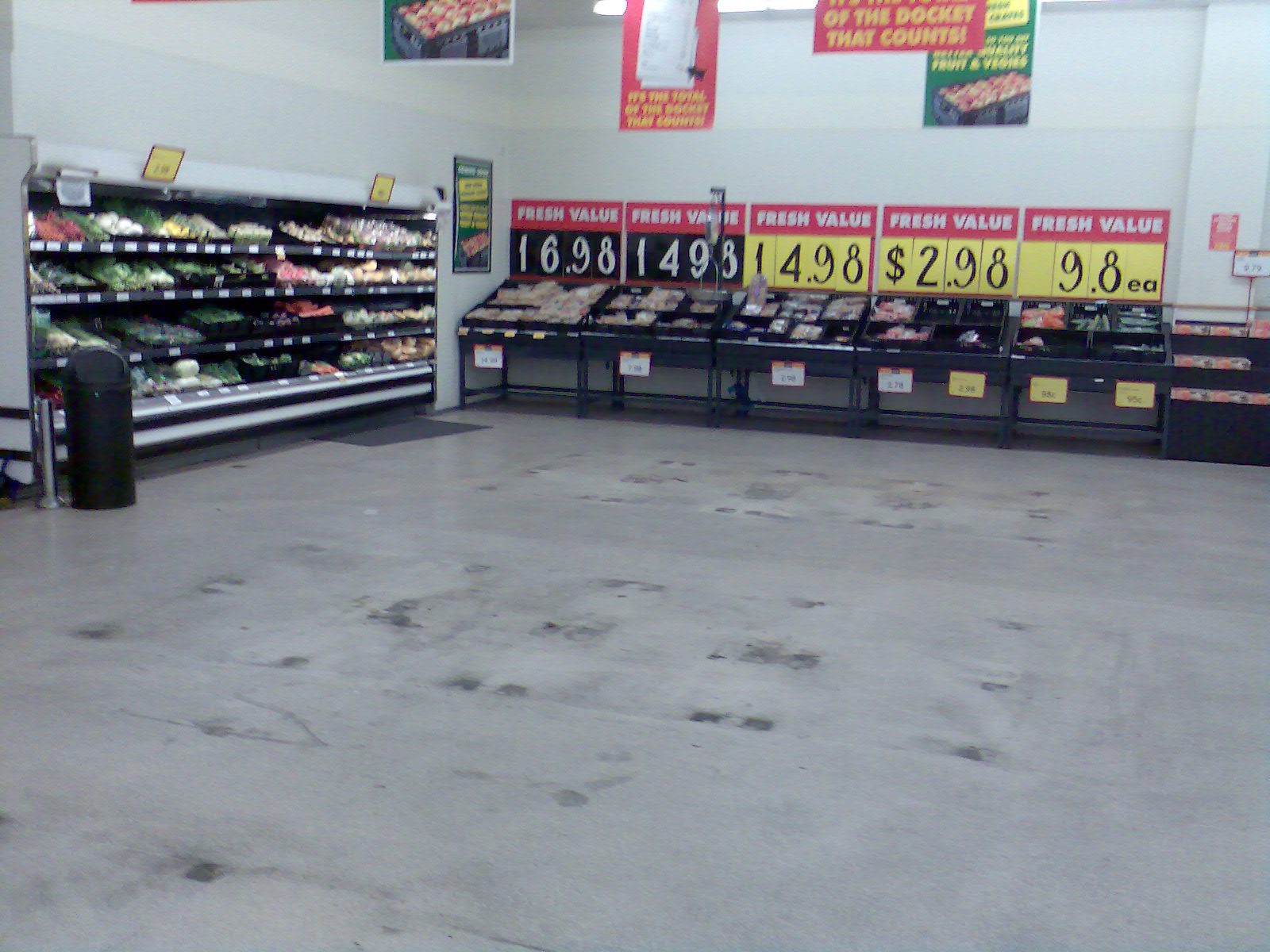
A Bi-Lo supermarket produce department during the Coles rebranding

However, in March 2007, Coles Group announced that it was "pausing" the rebranding of Bi-Lo stores following poor results from the 129 stores rebranded by that point. Market analysts said the conversion program had been unsuccessful because Coles first converted stores in affluent areas, replaced Bi-Lo's budget items with more expensive equivalents, and removed Bi-Lo's trademark budget meat packs.

Reflecting on the failed conversion strategy later in 2007, Coles chief operating officer Mick McMahon stated that "a strategy you can't execute is probably not the right strategy".

In October 2008, Coles stated it was planning to create a discount supermarket chain to replace the remaining Bi-Lo stores. In 2009, Coles stated it would sell eight of the remaining Bi-Lo stores to rival chain Foodworks. Further stores were closed or marked for closure due to poor performance and small store size, including stores in Armidale and Merimbula.

At its peak, Bi-Lo had more than 180 stores and employed 13,600 people. By September 2009, only 60 stores remained: 39 in New South Wales, 19 in Queensland and 2 in Victoria. By the end of December 2014, that number had fallen to seven. Following the closure of the Warwick and Alderley stores in Queensland in March 2016 (both later reopened as Coles) and Coles' takeover of the Lisarow store in New South Wales in April 2016, only one Bi-Lo store remained, at Shailer Park, Queensland. It closed on 30 June 2017, ending the Bi-Lo brand after 38 years of operation.

== Advertising ==
The tagline "Extra Value for You" was used from 1999 to 2003, when it was replaced by "Why Pay More!" Between 2000 and 2005, television cook Iain Hewitson was the face of Bi-Lo and Newmart supermarkets across Australia, with Bi-Lo sponsoring and supplying his cooking shows. In 2003, a campaign recording customer answers to "Why do you shop at Bi-Lo?" was used. In late 2005, a stylised Bi-Lo docket was adopted as Bi-Lo's mascot, replacing Hewitson. At this time, the tagline "It's the total of the docket that counts!" was used. In 2007, amid the Coles conversion, an election-style campaign also featured the stylised Bi-Lo Docket with the tagline "Reduce the total of your docket!" Former slogans included "We Do, You Do" and "Cheap Groceries".

== Operations ==
=== Defunct store formats ===
==== Bi-Lo ====
Standard format

==== Bi-Lo Mega Frrresh ====
In response to its main competitor Franklins' launch of "Franklins Big Fresh" in the early 1990s, Bi-Lo launched its Mega Frrresh brand at Greenacres, South Australia, in 1994. Like Franklins Big Fresh, it combined discount shopping with a market-style atmosphere.

==== Newmart ====
Newmart Supermarkets
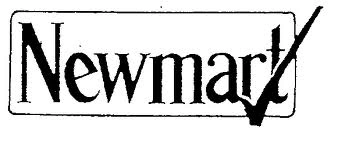
- Type: Subsidiary
- Industry: Retail
- Founded: 1987; 39 years ago
- Founder: Fred Fairthorne
- Defunct: 2017; 9 years ago
- Fate: Rebranded as Coles Supermarkets
- Number of locations: 18 stores (2002)
- Area served: Western Australia
- Parent: Bi-Lo

Newmart was an independent discount supermarket chain founded in Perth, Western Australia, in 1987 by Fred Fairthorne Jr. of Farmer Jack's fame. It had a similar format to Bi-Lo: discount groceries, bulk foods, extensive fresh produce, meat and delicatessen sections.

The Newmart chain grew to 18 stores by 2002.

In 1987, three stores opened in Greenwood, Floreat and Kardinya. By 1992, Newmart was part of the West Australian Independent Grocers buying group, which also included Farmer Jack's, Advantage, MAC's and Charlie Carter's; its home-brand products were "Black & Gold". A further three stores were opened between 1992 and 1996.

Bi-Lo purchased six Newmart supermarkets in 1996 for A$16 million. Bi-Lo was unable to rebrand the stores because Foodland Associated Limited was already trading stores in Western Australia under the Bi-Lo name. Following the acquisition, Newmart effectively became a Western Australian version of Coles' South Australian-based budget brand, Bi-Lo. Bi-Lo-branded products were introduced, the well-recognised Newmart tick logo was redesigned to resemble Bi-Lo's yellow logo, and Newmart stores were refitted to match Bi-Lo's national image while retaining the Newmart name. Like Bi-Lo, Newmart launched the slogan "Extra Value for You" in 1999.

In 2002, Coles assumed management of Newmart, immediately rebranding seven stores as Coles supermarkets, before discontinuing the Newmart brand in 2003. The Newmart website remained online until 2006. Coles sold five stores to Action Supermarkets, all of which later became Woolworths outlets. These stores were located at Noranda, Stirling Central, Booragoon, Clarkson and Collie. The Coles supermarket in Bentley, Western Australia, retained Newmart awnings, aisle signage and checkouts until the store closed on 22 September 2017. The site was immediately refurbished as a Spudshed. The Woolworths store at Stirling Central Shopping Centre in Westminster, Western Australia, retained Newmart awnings, checkouts and security (loss-prevention) buzzers on stands at the end of the checkouts until its refurbishment in 2018.

==== Shoeys ====
Shoeys Supermarkets
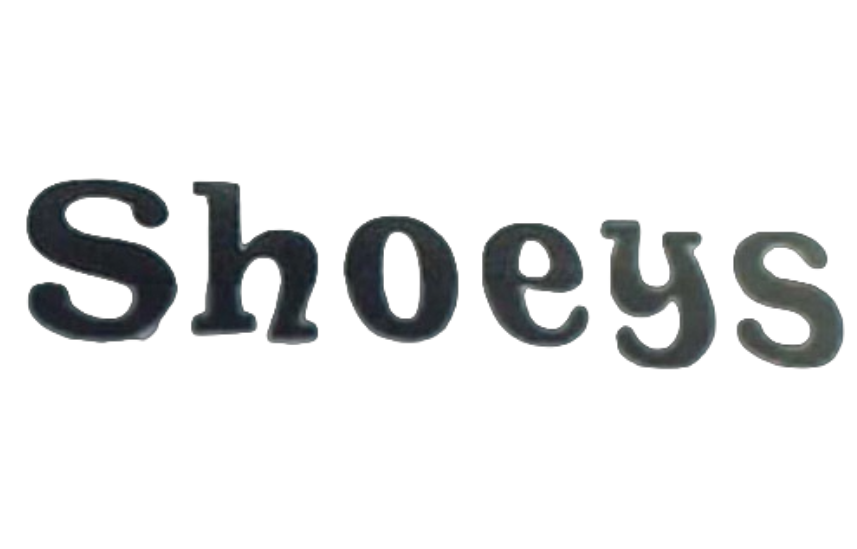
- Shoeys logo
- Type: Subsidiary
- Industry: Retail
- Defunct: 1987; 39 years ago
- Fate: Rebranded as Bi-Lo
- Headquarters: Newcastle, New South Wales, Australia
- Number of locations: 34 stores (1987)
- Area served: New South Wales
- Services: Discount supermarket
- Parent: Bi-Lo

In 1987, Coles Myer purchased the 34-store Shoeys discount supermarket chain in New South Wales, which was subsequently rebranded as Bi-Lo.
