= Foodland (South Australia) =

Australian supermarket chain

Foodland IGA
- Type: Brand
- Industry: Supermarkets
- Founded: 1962; 64 years ago
- Founder: Hoeper family & various others
- Headquarters: Adelaide, South Australia, Australia
- Number of locations: 90 stores (2025)
- Area served: South Australia; Broken Hill, New South Wales
- Key people: Franklin dos Santos (CEO)
- Owner: Metcash (brand name); Independent groups (stores)
- Number of employees: 7,000+
- Website: http://www.foodlandsa.com.au/

Foodland is an Australian supermarket chain in South Australia, founded in 1962.

Foodland is an established brand in the South Australian retail sector, directly employing over 7,000 staff and indirectly more than 1,500 South Australian staff. There were 96 stores covering South Australia and Broken Hill in 2023.

The stores are mostly operated by individuals and the stores reflect the owners and locations. The majority owner is Metcash.

== History ==
The Hoeper family established a grocery store in 1871, at Glenelg South in Adelaide. In 1962, it became the first store to be branded Foodland. It has been expanded and modified over the years to become a small shopping centre, and is now run by Romeo's Retail Group.

In 2005, the Foodland brand name was bought by Metcash-owned IGA. The stores are independently owned and reflect their individual owners and locations.

In April 2014, Con Sciacca was appointed Foodland CEO, having previously held several positions at Metcash. In July 2020, Franklin dos Santos took over as CEO.

From 2015 to 2021, Foodland and their South Australian customers helped raise $82,935 for Minda Inc disability communities. Foodland supports local community groups and programs including the CFS, Foodbank, Cancer Council, Flinders Foundation, and Country Women's Association.

== Notable owners ==
Romeo's Retail Group
- Industry: Retail
- Founded: 1987; 39 years ago
- Headquarters: North Adelaide, South Australia, Australia
- Number of locations: 39 stores (2019)
- Area served: South Australia; New South Wales
- Website: www.romeosretailgroup.com.au

=== Chapley family ===
The Chapley brothers, John and Nick, own a large number of metropolitan Adelaide Foodland stores. Commercial Retail Group (CRG) runs two of the flagship stores, at Pasadena and Frewville. The latter won the "International Retailer of the Year excellence award" at the IGA Conference in the US in 2016. The Pasadena and Frewville stores trade as "Adelaide's Finest Supermarkets".

Munno Para, Norwood, Henley Square, Saints, and Sefton Plaza Foodland are notable stores run by the Chapley family. In 2024, Saints Foodland was awarded the World's Best Supermarket at the IGA International Retailer Awards in Las Vegas.

=== Eudunda Farmers Limited ===
Eudunda Farmers Ltd is a co-operative established at Eudunda in country South Australia in 1896.

Eudunda Farmers currently own and operate 18 Foodland stores and three IGA stores throughout country, South Australia.

=== Klose family ===
The Klose family runs a number of Foodland supermarkets in the Adelaide Hills. Precisely Balhannah, Birdwood, Littlehampton, Lobethal, Nairne and Woodside.

=== Romeo's Retail Group ===
The Romeo's Retail Group owns 39 Foodland IGA stores in South Australia as of September 2019. Notable stores include Adelaide CBD, and the recently opened Royal Park store as part of the Hendon Central Shopping Centre.

In New South Wales, the Romeo's Retail Group have a number of IGAs called Locali and "Food Hall".

== See also ==
- List of supermarket chains in Oceania
