= FoodWorks =

Australian supermarket chain

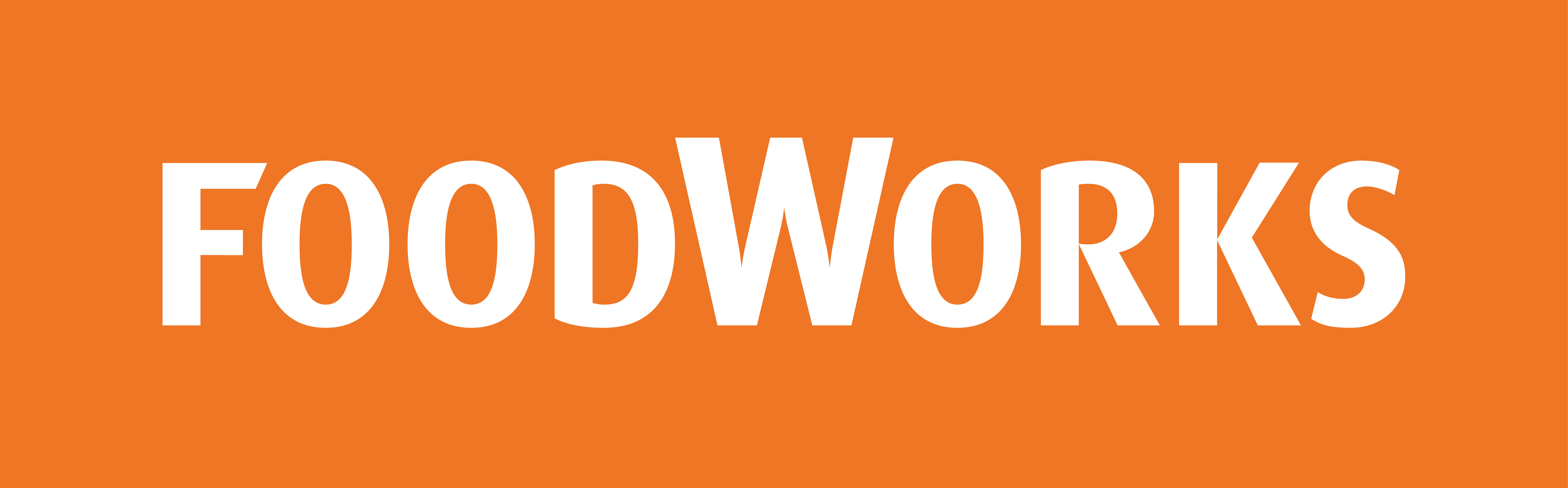
- FoodWorks logo

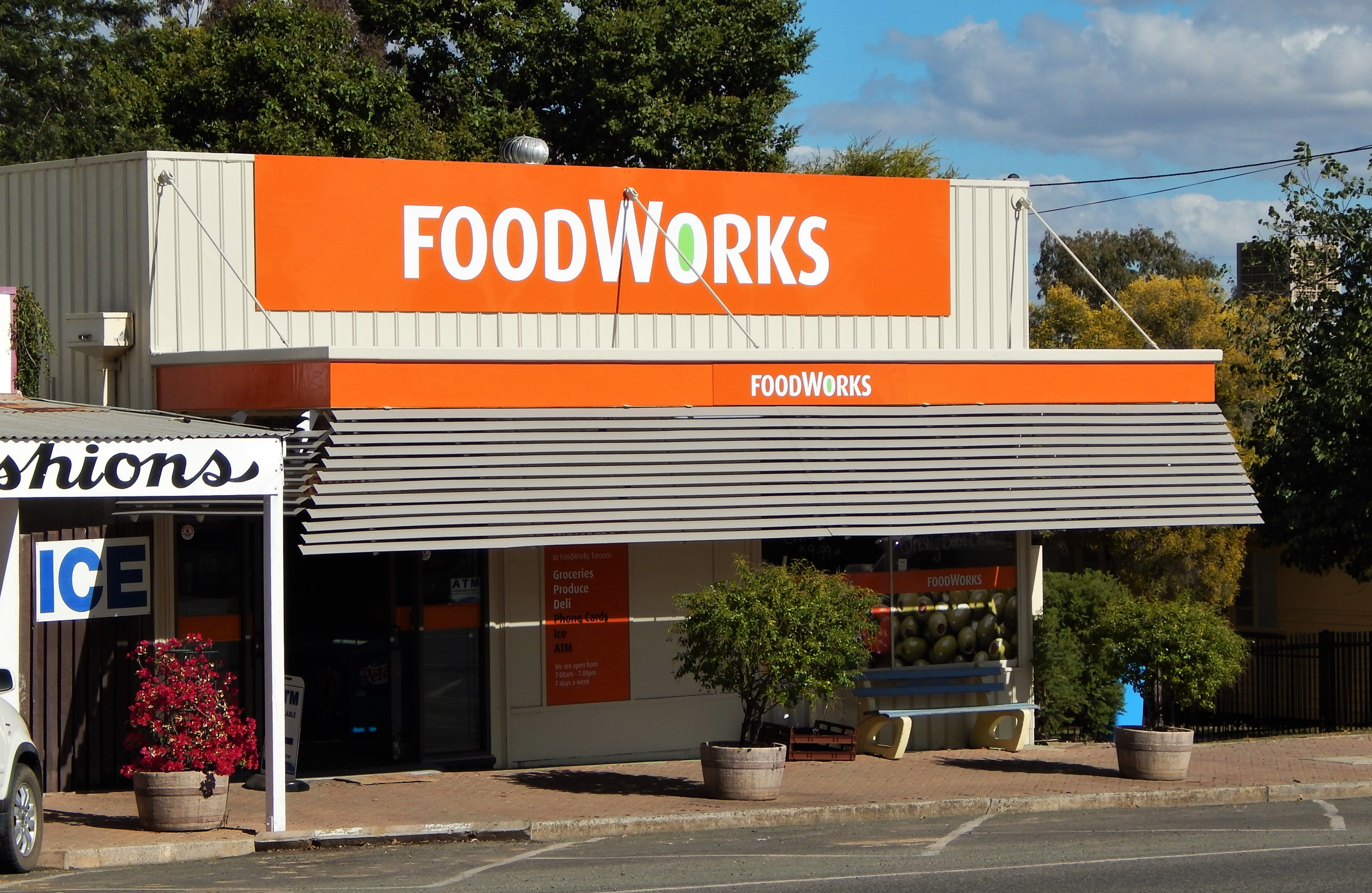
- FoodWorks store in Taroom, Queensland
- Company type: Subsidiary
- Industry: Retail
- Founded: November 2004; 21 years ago
- Headquarters: South Wharf, Victoria, Australia
- Number of locations: 332 stores (2025)
- Key people: Rick Wight (CEO)
- Products: Supermarkets, grocery stores and convenience stores
- Revenue: ▲ A$160 million (2024)
- Net income: A$3 million (2022)
- Parent: Australian United Retailers
- Website: foodworks.com.au

FoodWorks is an Australian supermarket chain run by independent retail group Australian United Retailers (AUR). It is Australia's second largest independent supermarket retailing group behind Metcash, supporting in excess of A$2.6 billion in annual sales at the retail level. Its main competitors are Woolworths, Coles, IGA and Aldi.

The AUR and FoodWorks Management team is led by CEO Rick Wight and Executive General Manager Jon Yarnall.

== History ==
AUR was created in November 2004 from the merger of the FoodWorks Supermarket Group and Australian United Retailers (AUR). Retail groups that were part of the merger included:

- 7"2"7
- AUR
- Banana Joe's
- Buy Rite
- Cut Price
- Food-Rite
- Food-Way
- FoodStore
- FoodWorks
- Rite-Way
- Tuckerbag

== Operations ==
The AUR currently has over 600 supermarkets, grocery stores and convenience stores. The stores span seven states and territories. Over 400 stores are operating under the FoodWorks brand. FoodWorks has some similarities to IGA, the brand's closest competitor. They have similar ancestry, both being created from independent retail stores merging to create supermarket groups. Also, both comprise multiple individual retailers originally trading under some of the same independent chains.

== Store formats ==
=== Current store formats ===
==== Foodworks Asian Supermarket ====
Large Asian supermarket format.

==== FoodWorks Express ====
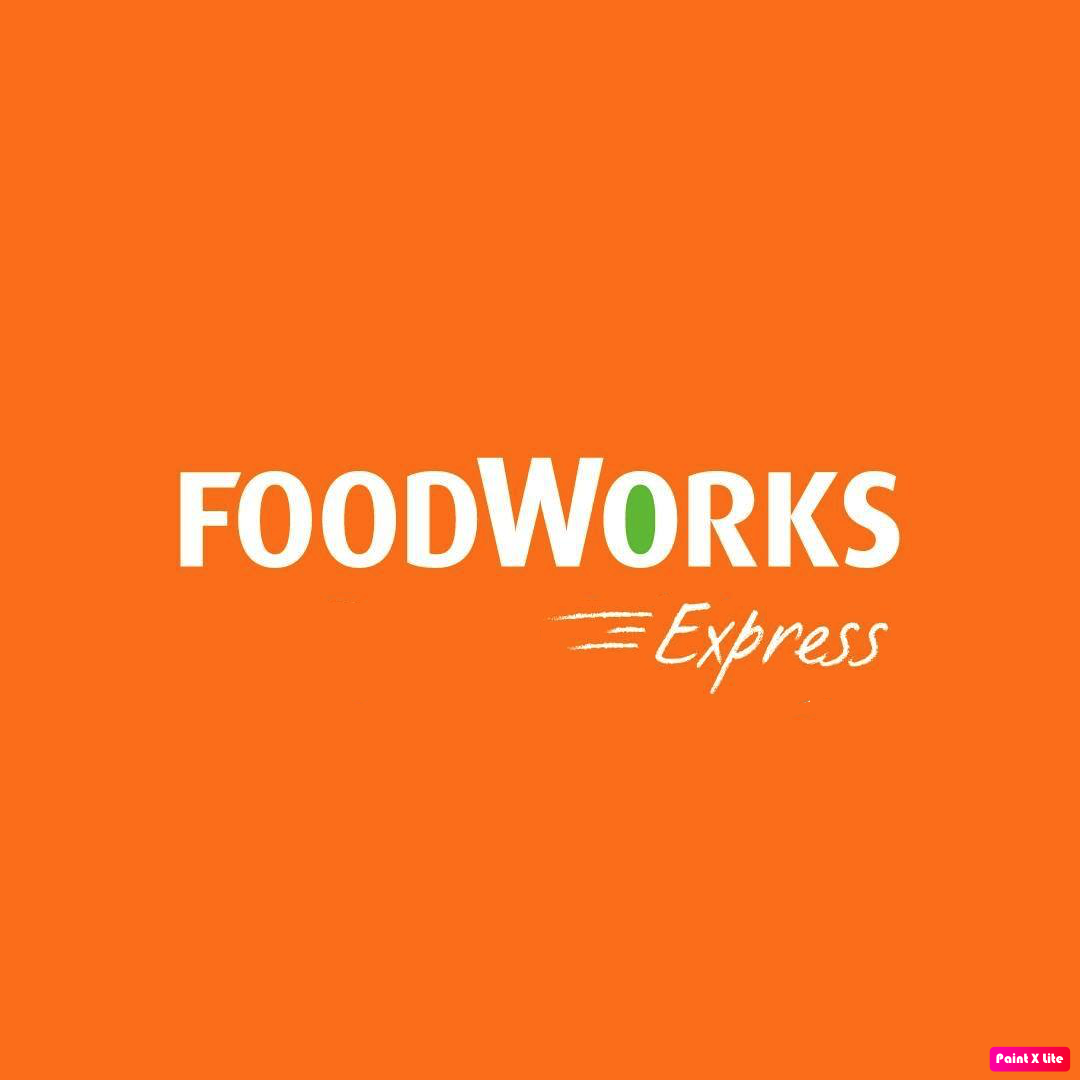
FoodWorks Express logo

Convenience store format suited to ‘grab and go’ shop.

==== FoodWorks Local ====
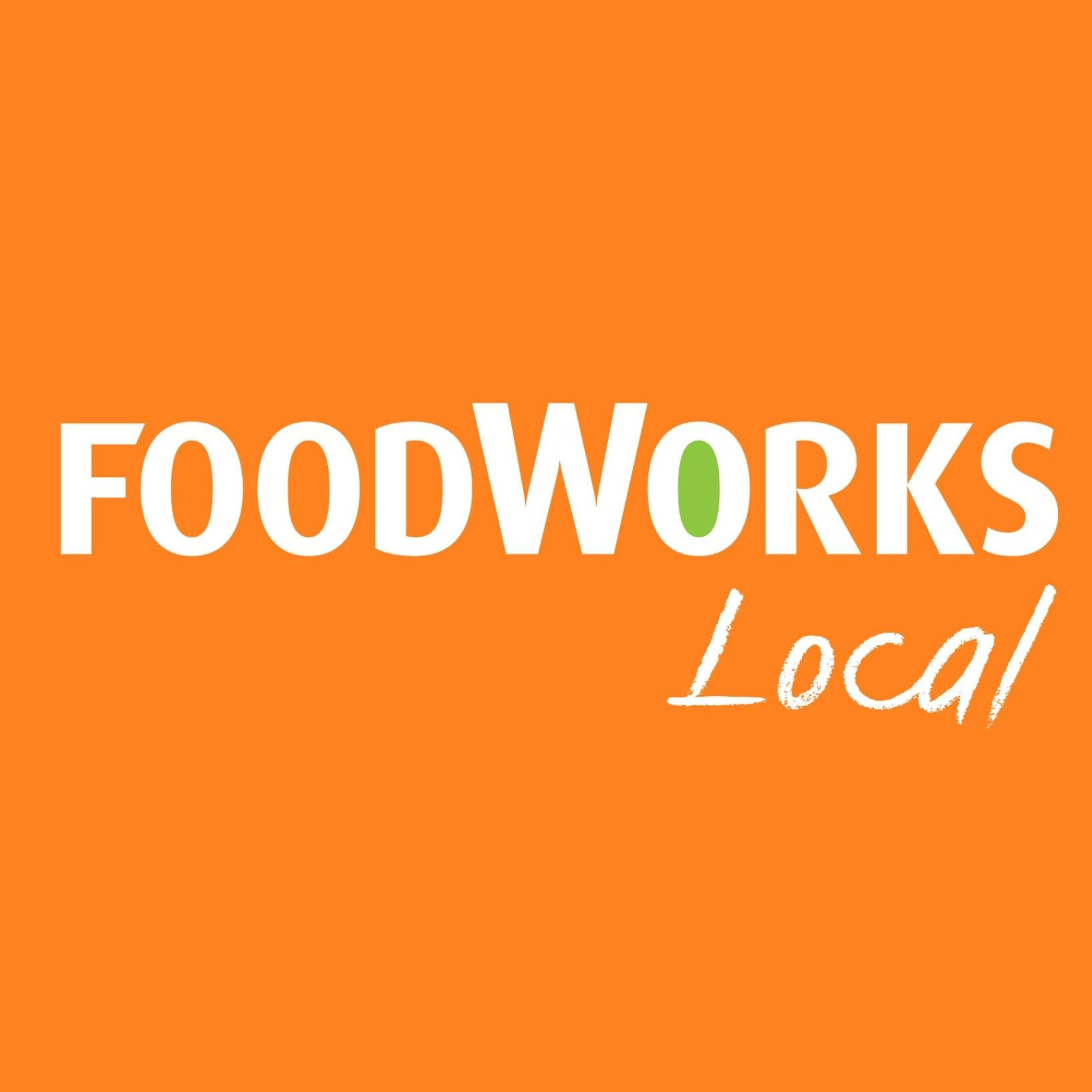
FoodWorks Local logo

Grocery store format aimed at top-ups and secondary shops.

==== FoodWorks Supermarket ====
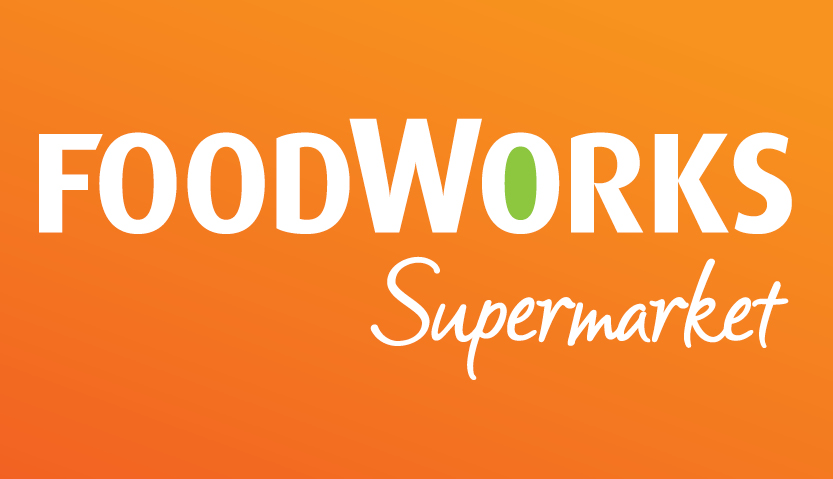
FoodWorks Supermarket logo

Large supermarket format delivering a full shop.

==== Farmer Jack's ====
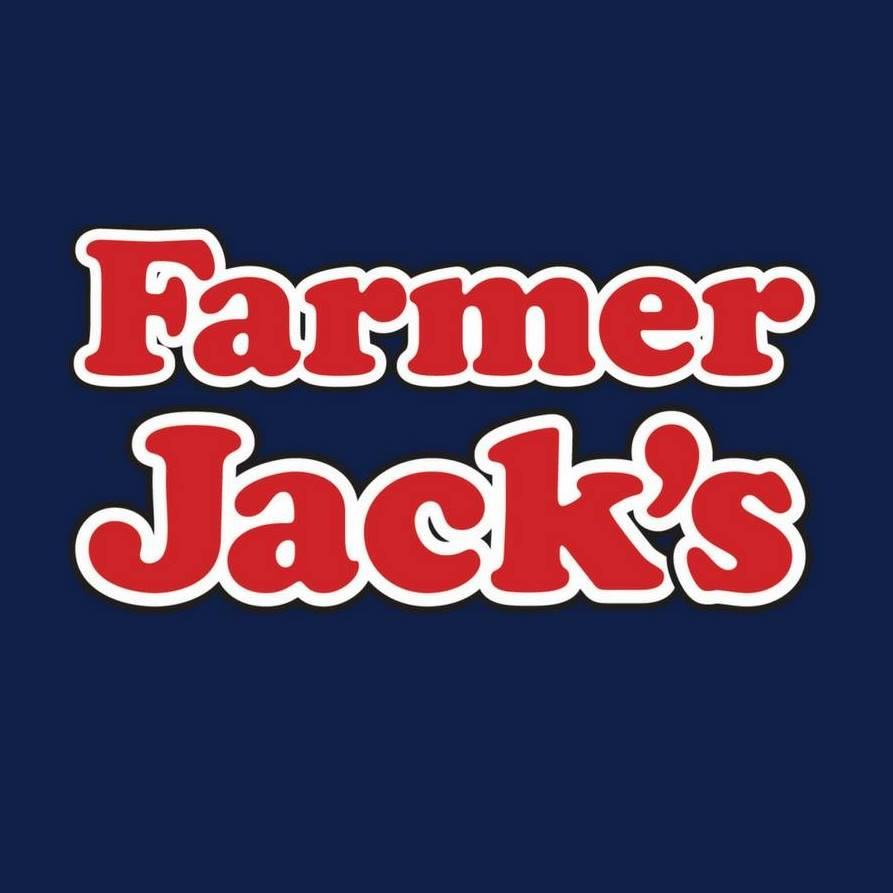
Farmer Jack's logo

Farmer Jack's FoodWorks operates 12 FoodWorks stores in Western Australia. Farmer Jack's FoodWorks uses four trading names:

- "Farmer Jack's" since 1987
- "Farmer Jack's FoodWorks"
- "FoodWorks"
- "Jack's Wholefoods and Groceries" (Claremont store)

==== Hannan's Marketplace ====
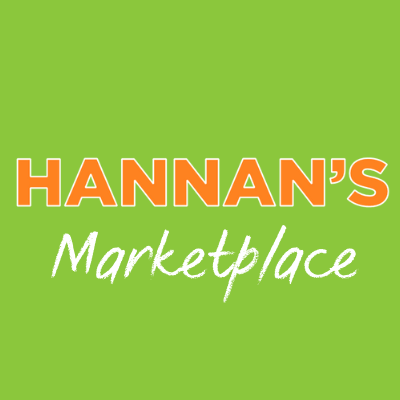
Hannan's Marketplace logo

In Kalgoorlie, the trading name is "Hannan's Marketplace by FoodWorks".

==== Blackwood Fresh ====
In Bridgetown, the store has been trading as "Blackwood Fresh FoodWorks" since 2011.

== Private label brands ==
=== Best Buy ===
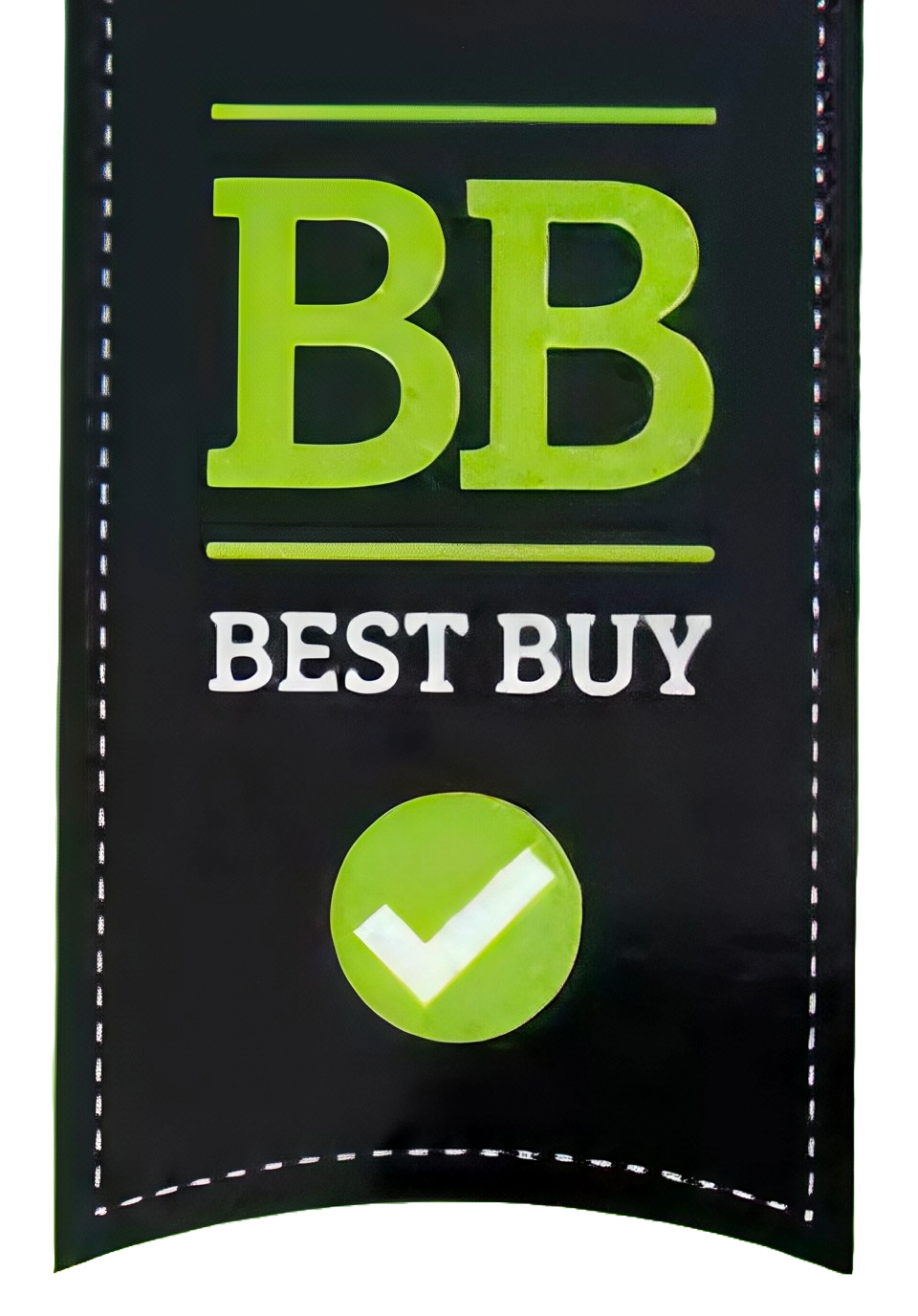
Best Buy logo

A value brand that competes with Woolworths Essentials, Coles Simply and Metcash Black & Gold.

In addition, Metcash's home brands Black & Gold and Community Co., are stocked in FoodWorks stores across the country.

== See also ==
- List of supermarket chains in Oceania
