= Metcash =

Australian conglomerate

Metcash Limited
- Formerly: Davids Holdings (1927-1987); Australian Liquor Marketers (1987-2000)
- Type: Public
- Traded as: ASX: MTS
- Industry: Retail
- Founded: 1927; 99 years ago in Woolloomooloo, Australia
- Founder: Joe David
- Headquarters: Australia
- Number of locations: 6,531 stores List: 3,349 Liquor; 2,448 Food & Grocery; 734 Hardware; (2025)
- Area served: Australia
- Key people: Doug Jones (CEO)
- Products: Supermarkets; convenience stores; hardware stores; liquor stores
- Services: Food distributor; hardware retail; liquor retailing; consumer goods
- Divisions: Australian Liquor Marketers; Food & Grocery; Hardware
- Website: www.metcash.com

Metcash Limited is an Australian wholesaler and service provider to independent businesses across food, liquor and hardware. ASX-listed (ASX:MTS), the company is headquartered in Macquarie Park, Sydney.

== History ==
In 1927, Joe David founded his first corner store in Woolloomooloo, Sydney trading as Davids. Having expanded to six stores, in 1935 Davids opened a wholesale warehouse in Redfern. In 1966, Davids entered the liquor market by purchasing Harbottle Brown & Co. In 1980, the AG Campbells wholesale business was acquired.

In 1987 the liquor group was renamed Australian Liquor Marketers. The IGA brand was introduced to Australia by Davids Holdings in 1988 when 10 stores became members of IGA.

IGA Supermarkets logo

In 1998, South African company Metoz (known as Metro Cash & Carry at that time) acquired a majority stake in Davids .

In 2000, the business was rebranded to Metcash, which the name was derived from its South African parent company. In 2005, Metcash and Woolworths purchased Foodland. Under the agreement, Foodland was divided into two with Metcash acquiring most of the Australian operations and Woolworths acquiring the New Zealand operations and 22 supermarkets in Australia.

In 2010, Metcash acquired the Franklins brand and converted its stores to the IGA banner. In the same year, Mitre 10 hardware business became part of the Metcash Group.

In 2012, Metcash took a majority share in Automotive Brands Group, which operated the Autobarn and Autopro chain of stores, for A$53 million and incorporated it into its automotive division. The company then sold its automotive division to Burson Group (now Bapcor) in 2015 for A$275 million. The chief executive officer of the automotive division was Supercar driver Paul Dumbrell.

In 2016, Independent Hardware Group is created with the combination of the Mitre 10 and Home Timber & Hardware networks.

In 2020, Metcash acquired 70% of Total Tools (increasing to 85% in 2021 and 100% in 2023). Total Tools is franchisor to the largest tool retail network in Australia.

In February 2024, Metcash announced that it had signed three acquisition agreements (Superior Food Group; Bianco Construction Supplies; Alpine Truss) cumulatively valued at approximately US$558.5 million.

In 2025, Metcash merged Independent Hardware Group and Total Tools to form the Total Tools and Hardware Group. It also launched its retail media network LocalEyes.

In 2026, Metcash acquired 3 Daly's IGA, as well as supermarkets in Goolwa and Naracoorte, the acquisitions made the group re-entered the supermarket retail sector, on top of its supplier role.

== Operations ==
The company has three business divisions, being Food, Liquor (Australian Liquor Marketers) and Hardware (Total Tools and Hardware Group).

It owns many different banner brands, including IGA, Home Hardware, Mitre 10, Total Tools, Cellarbrations and Thirsty Camel. It licenses these banners to independent retailers, and provides marketing and operations support. The company also supplies banners that are not owned by Metcash, including FoodWorks and Friendly Grocer.

Metcash also operates a foodservice and convenience division, made up of Superior Foods, Campbells, C-Store Distribution and Independent Grocers (NT).

=== Metcash Food & Grocery ===
==== Metcash supported brands ====
- IGA
- Foodland IGA
- IGA Local Grocer
- Supa Valu IGA
- Village Grocer

==== Foodservice and Convenience ====
- Superior Food Group
- Campbells
- C-Store Distribution
- Independent Grocers (NT)

==== Supplied by Metcash ====
- FoodWorks (also known as "Australian United Retailers", "Farmer Jack's", etc.)
- Friendly Grocer
- BP
- Ampol Foodary
- 7-Eleven (Western Australia only)
- The Coffee Club (via Superior Food Services)

=== Australian Liquor Marketers (ALM) ===
Australian Liquor Marketers is the liquor arm of Metcash, distributing liquor to independent businesses and premises around Australia and New Zealand. The company has 13 distribution centres across every state and territory of Australia, and in New Zealand. It is Australia's largest supplier of liquor to independently owned liquor retailers and largest broad-range liquor wholesaler, supplying to 12,000 liquor customers. Independent Brands Australia (IBA) supports national retail brands including:

- Cellarbrations
- IGA Plus Liquor
- Porter's Liquor
- The Bottle O
- Thirsty Camel

=== Total Tools and Hardware Group ===
- Alpine Truss
- Bianco
- Hardings
- Home Hardware
- Mitre 10
- Plants Plus
- Thrifty-Link Hardware
- Total Tools
- True Value Hardware

== Private label brands ==
=== Black & Gold ===
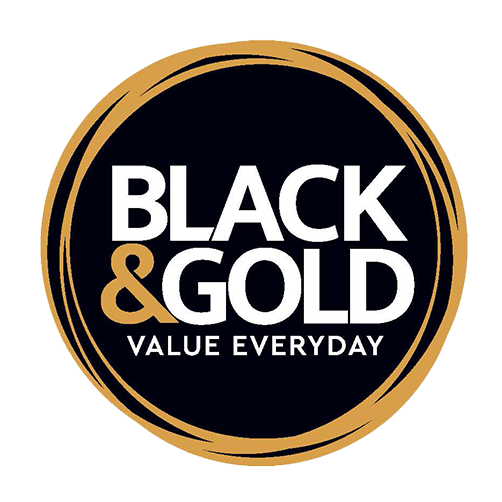
Black & Gold logo

A value brand that competes with Woolworths Essentials, Coles Simply and FoodWorks Best Buy.

=== Community Co ===
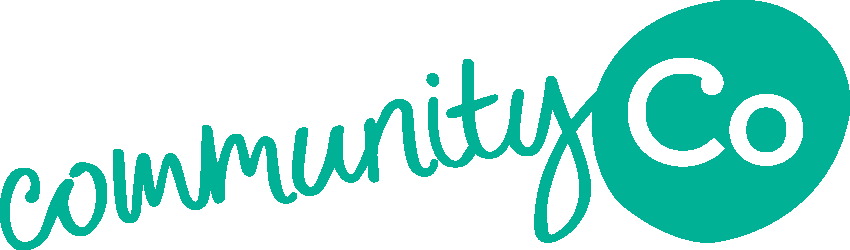
Community Co logo

A mid-price line designed to match established branded products.
