= IGA Supermarkets =

Australian supermarket chain owned by Metcash

Independent Grocers of Australia

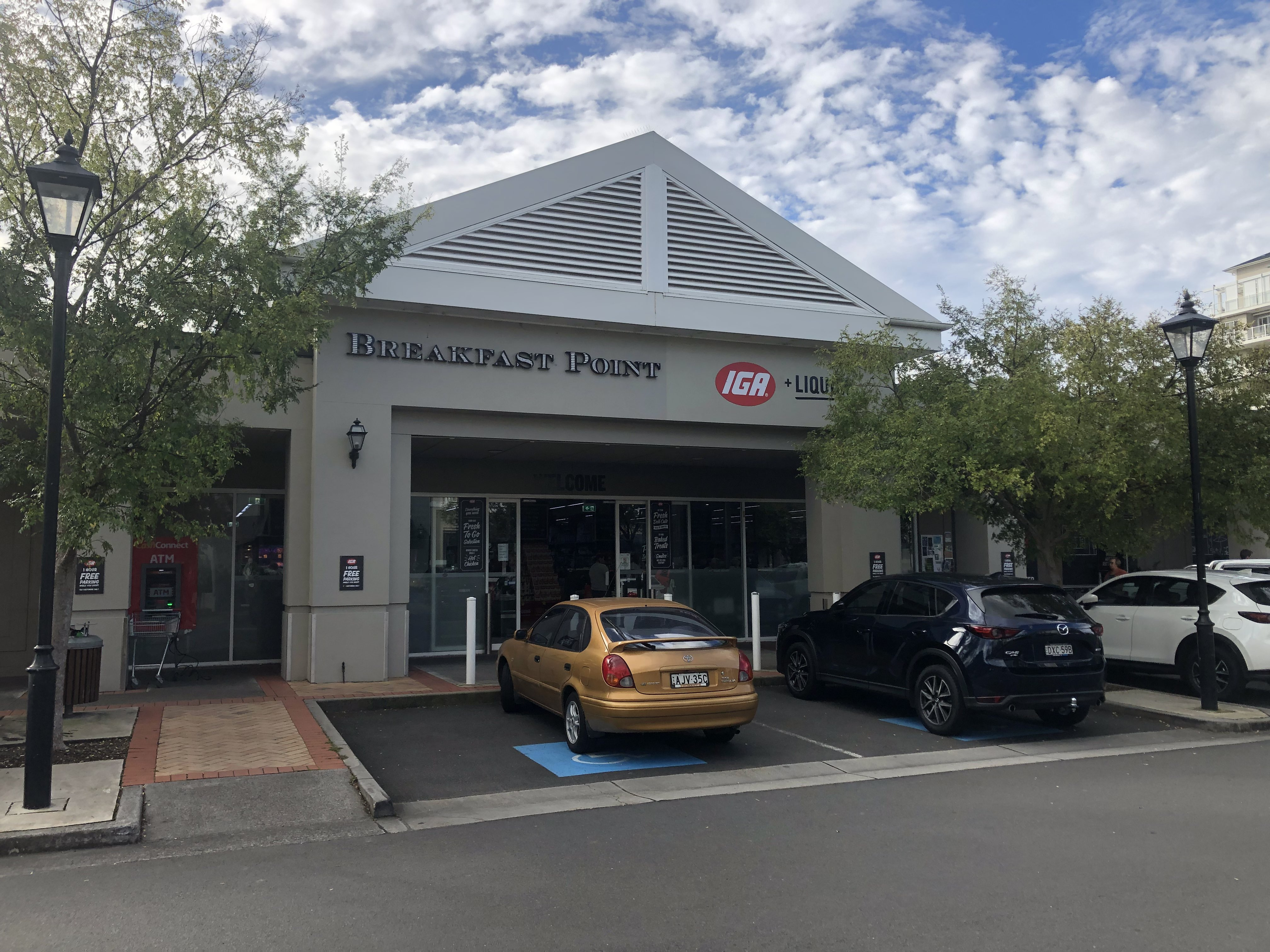
- An IGA supermarket in Breakfast Point, New South Wales
- Type: Subsidiary
- Industry: Retail
- Founded: 1988; 38 years ago (as Independent Grocers Alliance)
- Headquarters: Macquarie Park, New South Wales, Australia
- Number of locations: 1,400 (2020)
- Key people: Grant Ramage (CEO)
- Products: Groceries & general products
- Brands: IGA Supermarkets; Supa IGA; IGA X-press; IGA Local Grocer; Foodland (SA)
- Revenue: ▲ A$14.12 billion (2017)
- Parent: Metcash
- Website: www.iga.com.au

Independent Grocers of Australia is an Australian chain of supermarkets. The IGA brand is owned by Australian conglomerate Metcash under their Food & Grocery division, but individual IGA stores are owned and operated independently. Its main competitors are Aldi, Coles and Woolworths. IGA is the fourth largest supermarket chain in Australia, following Aldi overtaking Metcash in supermarket revenue.

== History ==
In 1988, the IGA brand was introduced to Australia by Davids Holdings, when 10 stores became members of IGA. In 2019, IGA had 7% of the grocery market in Australia. In January 2020, there were over 1,400 IGA stores in Australia.

IGA stores are typically located in suburbs that are too small, remote or do not have existing larger stores. Some stores offer a larger selection of curated or artisan products, than the bigger chains.

In 2018, IGA began a rebrand to position the chain as a uniquely local option, scrapping the white colour and corrugated metal for dark grey, signwriting typography and handcrafted style icons. As part of the rebrand their slogan "How the locals like it" was changed to "Where the locals matter".

== Store formats ==
There are a wide variety of stores under the IGA banner, from small convenience stores, mid sized supermarkets, large full service supermarkets and liquor stores:

- IGA Fine Food Market
- IGA Local Grocer
- IGA Supermarket
- IGA X-press
- Supa Valu
- Foodland IGA

== Private label brands ==
IGA has two Metcash store brand lines. These brands are available at IGA and other Metcash supplied independent supermarkets.

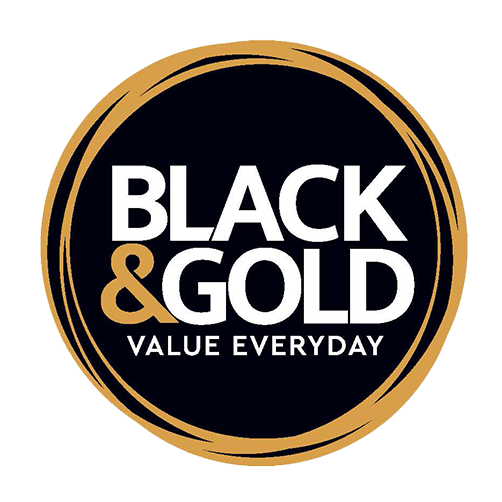
Black & Gold logo

=== Black & Gold ===
Black & Gold is a generic food and product brand.

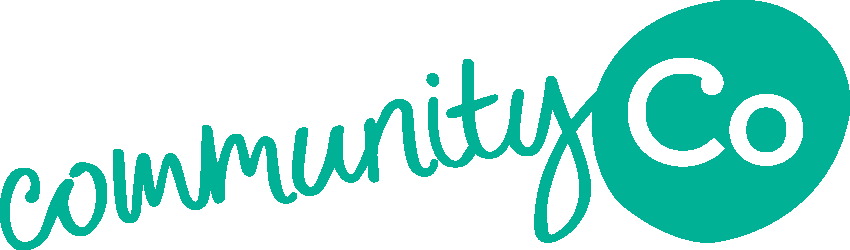
Community Co. logo

=== Community Co. ===
Community Co. are higher quality products which links through with the IGA Community Chest program.

== See also ==
- List of supermarket chains in Oceania
