= Howard Smith (company) =

Australian industrial company

Howard Smith Limited
- Traded as: ASX: SMI
- Founded: 1854
- Founder: William Howard Smith
- Defunct: 2001
- Headquarters: George Street, Sydney, Australia
- Revenue: $2.9 billion (June 2001)
- Net income: $248 million (June 2001)
- Website: www.howardsmith.com.au

Howard Smith Limited was an Australian industrial company. Founded in 1854 as a shipping company, it later diversified into coal mining, steel production, stevedoring, travel, railway rolling stock building, sugar production and retail. Its divisions began to be sold off in the 1990s with the remainder taken over by Wesfarmers in August 2001.

== Shipping ==
On 7 July 1854 Captain William Howard Smith arrived in Melbourne from England as skipper of the 177 ton steamer Express in which he held a 50% share along with the ship's engineer, SB Skinner. On 3 October 1854, the Express began operating the first regular passenger service in Australia from Melbourne to Geelong. Smith sold his share in the business to Thomas Parker in 1861 and returned to England.

In May 1864, Howard returned to Australia with the 672 ton Kief, a former British Army water carrier and entered the interstate coal trade with a service from Melbourne to Sydney and Newcastle. In 1875, Howard recommenced operating passenger services. Services were extended to Townsville in 1883, Adelaide in 1885 and Fremantle in 1893.

In 1947 Howard Smith withdrew from the interstate passenger market. In 1961 the Melbourne Steamship Company was taken over. In 1968 Howard Smith withdrew from the interstate shipping market and concentrated on bulk shipping and the management of specialised ships for others. In 1969 Howard Smith entered the bulk carrier trade market with the purchase of 1964 built Hoegh Helm from Leif Hoegh & Co of Norway.

In 1972 a takeover offer was made for RW Miller.H Smith formal offer for Miller Although not successful, Howard Smith gained a 35% shareholding. This attempted takeover and protracted takeover battle was associated with an important legal case and subsequent appeal to the Privy Council, Howard Smith Ltd v Ampol Petroleum Ltd. Howard Smith's shareholding in RW Miller was increased to 67% in 1979 when it acquired Ampol's shareholding and in February 1985 it took 100% ownership. In March 1989, Howard Smith purchased the Dilmun Navigation Co from Inchcape. Howard Smith withdrew from the shipping business in 1996 with the sale of its remaining two vessels.

== Tugboats ==
Howard Smith was the largest operator of tugboats in Australia, operating both in its own right and in partnerships. It also had operations in Bougainville and Suva. In June 1987, a 75% share (100% from December 1989) in salvage and ocean towing business North British Marine Group of Hull was purchased. In 1993 the Alexandria Towing Group business, the largest in the United Kingdom, was purchased. In May 2001 the 90 vessel tugboat operation was sold to Adsteam Marine.

== Iron & steel ==
In 1918 Howard Smith took a shareholding in Vickers Commonwealth Steel Products. In May 1928 it took a 19% shareholding in a partnership with Hoskins Iron & Steel, Dorman Long and Baldwins to form Australian Iron & Steel. It was heavily involved in the building of the Port Kembla steelworks. It also owned Southern Portland Cement which operated a cement plant at Berrima and a quarry at Marulan. In October 1935, Howard Smith's iron and steel interests were sold to BHP.

== Coal ==
Howard Smith owned Caledonian Collieries that controlled five collieries in South Maitland and the Cockle Creek Power Station. It also owned the Invincible Colliery at Cullen Bullen. In 1960 Caledonian Collieries merged with J & A Brown and Abermain & Seaham Collieries to form Coal & Allied with Howard Smith owning 48%. By 1989 this was down to down to 6% with this sold in 1991.

== Travel centres ==
A travel centre opened in Newcastle followed by branches in Sydney and Cairns. In 1980 it became Howard Smith & Patrick Travel with further branches in Brisbane and Gladstone. It was sold to Burns Philp in February 1985.

== Railways ==
Having held a minority shareholding since 1917 following an unsuccessful attempted takeover, in October 1964 Howard Smith purchased railway rolling stock manufacturer A Goninan & Co. In August 1999, A Goninan & Co was sold to the United Group.

== Sugar mills ==
In 1976 the Moreton Central Sugar Mill, Nambour was purchased and in 1987 in partnership with Babinda Mill, Goondi mill was purchased from CSR. In March 1988, Mourilyan and Moreton mills were sold to Bundaberg Sugar.

== Stevedoring ==
Howard Smith gradually took over stevedore James Patrick Group, owning 73% by 1980 and 100% by 1990. In November 1988 Howard Smith and Australian National Line merged their stevedoring operations under the National Terminals brand with Howard Smith owning 40%. This was later increased to 50% before being diluted to 25% in 1990 when National Terminals merged with Strang Stevedoring. In November 1994 Howard Smith exited the stevedoring industry with the sale of National Terminals to Jamieson Equity.

== Retail ==
In April 1984, workplace products supplier J Blackwood & Son was purchased. In July 1994, the BBC hardware chain was purchased from Burns Philp. In March 1998 NZ Safety and Alsafe Safety Industries were purchased and integrated with Blackwoods, as was Protector Safety Supply Group when purchased from OPSM in May 2001.

== Investments ==
As well as actively being involved in the ownership and management of many companies, Howard Smith periodically bought and sold shareholdings in other companies but had little or no influence in their operation including:

- Adelaide Steamship Company
- AWA
- Belfast & Koroit Steam Navigation Company
- BHP
- EZ Industries
- Harbour Newspaper & Publishing Company
- Kooragang Coal Loader
- Melbourne Steamship Company
- Mount Isa Mines
- Port Waratah Services

== Headquarters ==
In 1928, the company's headquarters moved from Melbourne to George Street, Sydney.

== Demise ==
In June 2001 Wesfarmers launched a takeover bid for the company. The bid was successful with the BBC Hardware and Hardwarehouse chains integrated with Wesfarmers' Bunnings business. The Blackwood brand was retained. Howard Smith was delisted from the Australian Securities Exchange on 17 October 2001.
