= Bunning =

Bunning is a surname. Notable people with the surname include:

- David Bunning (born 1966), American jurist from Kentucky
- Erwin Bünning (1906–1990), German biologist
- James Bunstone Bunning (1802–1863), British architect
- Jim Bunning (1931–2017), American politician from Kentucky, and baseball player
- Lars Bünning (born 1998), German footballer
- Robert Bunning ( 1859–1936), Australian businessman
- Walter Bunning (1912–1977), Australian architect

== See also ==
- Bunnings, Australian hardware store operator
