= Magnet Mart =

Magnet Mart Pty Ltd
- Magnet Mart's logo featuring their "Start Smart" slogan
- Trade name: Paul's Home Improvement Centre
- Type: Private
- Industry: Hardware retail
- Founded: 18 June 1980
- Founder: Paul Donaghue
- Defunct: 2011
- Fate: Converted into Home Timber & Hardware stores
- Area served: Canberra; Queanbeyan

Magnet Mart was a Canberra-based chain of hardware stores that was locally owned and operated until 2011, when it was purchased by Woolworths. At its peak it operated five large hardware stores and employed approximately 400 people around Canberra and southern New South Wales in Australia. The first store with the Magnet Mart name was opened in 1985 in Queanbeyan, although stores which later became Magnet Marts were opened as the Paul's Home Centres in Phillip in 1972 and Belconnen in 1976. A large 13,500 m^{2} store in Gungahlin opened in 2002. A large store was also opened in Griffith in the Riverina region in 2005. This store was sold to Bunnings in August 2006. Magnet Mart formerly operated stores in Gungahlin, Phillip, Queanbeyan, Bowral and Goulburn.

Magnet Mart television advertisements feature prominently in Canberra and feature the many misadventures of the "Magnet Mart Guy" (played by actor Brendan Sloane). The slogan "Always cheaper cheaper Oi!" and its accompanying jingle were part of a well-known advertising campaign shown during the eighties and nineties.

Until 2006 Magnet Mart's slogan was "The Challenge Keeps us Cheaper", until it was replaced by "Better Prices, Better People". In January 2008 advertising was relaunched, ditching "Magnet Mart Guy" for a couple and their neighbor, Gus. The new slogan "Start Smart" (with Magnet Mart) was adopted. In 2009 the "Magnet Mart Guy" returned to accompany the Start Smart slogan and has worked to reinforce the branding.

In 2011, the remaining stores were bought by Woolworths and converted to Home Timber & Hardware stores.
