= Elizabeth Blair Barber =

Australian artist

- Born: 7 January 1909
- Died: 9 November 2001 (aged 92)
- Occupation: artist
- Spouse: Charles Bunning

Elizabeth Blair Barber (7 January 1909 - 9 November 2001) was an Australian artist, known for painting scenes portraying the timber industry in Western Australia. She established the Cremorne Gallery in Perth, which existed from 1968 to 1979, at a time when the art world was predominantly male-dominated.

She was married to Charles Bunning, major developer of the Bunnings chain.

== Legacy ==
Barber's contribution to the cultural life of Perth, as well as the efforts of fellow female gallerists Rie Heymans, Rose Skinner and Cherry Lewis, were remembered in 2026 as part of an exhibition at the North Metropolitan TAFE entitled "Pioneering Spaces: Four Women Who Shaped Perth's Art Scene".
