= Berrima railway line =

Partly closed railway in New South Wales

The Berrima railway line is a partly closed private railway line in New South Wales, Australia. It was a short branch from the Main South line to serve the Berrima Colliery.

== Early history ==
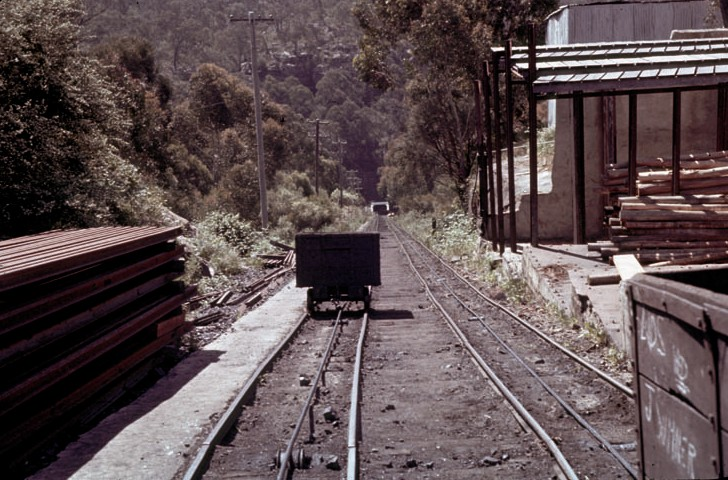
The inclined skipway used to bring coal from the mine to the terminus of the railway

The line originally began as a coal railway, built by the Berrima Coal Mining and Railway Company in 1881. That company opened a coal mine in the gorge of the Wingecarribee River, about 6 miles (9.66 km) west of Moss Vale and built a standard gauge line to a point above the gorge. It joined the Main Southern Railway at a point 1.5 miles (2.41 km) north of Moss Vale, then known as Austermere and later as Bong Bong. The railway crossed the Great Southern Road, later Hume Highway, on the level. At the colliery end, coal was brought up an incline from the mine which laid across the Wingecarribee River.

Motive power on the railway was a locomotive hired from the NSWGR and it was driven by the company's driver.

After the loss of contracts to Victorian Railways, the company went into liquidation about 1889.

== Southern Portland Cement Limited ==
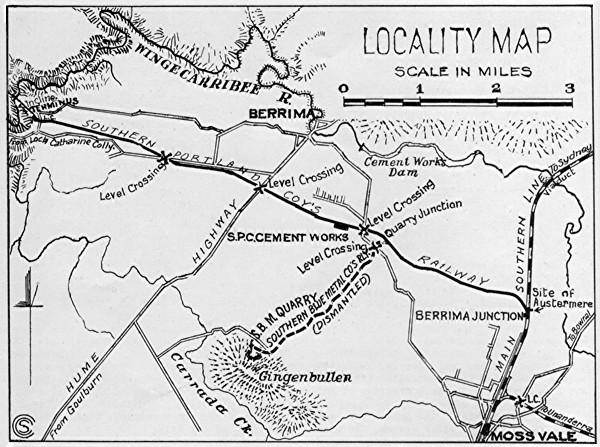
Map of railway

The abandoned right-of-way of the old Berrima Colliery line was purchased in 1925 by the Medway Colliery and Railway Company. Following the establishment of the Port Kembla steelworks, Southern Portland Cement Limited, a subsidiary of AIS, erected a cement works near Berrima to treat surplus limestone not required in steel-making. They acquired the right-of-way from the Medway company to construct a railway from the old Austermere Junction to a loading point at the old Berrima Colliery summit. Both locations were renamed Berrima Junction and Berrima Colliery after completion of the line on 4 February 1927.

An associated company, Southern Blue Metal Quarries Ltd., established a blue metal quarry at Gingen Bullen and built a branch from, and concurrently with, the Southern Portland Cement line to serve it. The quarry ceased production in 1942.

Adjacent to the junction at Berrima Junction lies the works of Southern Limestone Pty. Ltd. This company manufactures agricultural fertilisers. It was originally established about 1955 within the Berrima Cement Works, but transferred to this site in the early 1960s. This firm also uses the limestone mined at Marulan South.

== Private locomotives ==
A pool of locomotives was used between the company's line at Berrima and the limestone line at Marulan.

The first locomotive was owned by Southern Blue Metal Quarries Ltd. and was known as "Berrima No. 1" and was purchased from the NSWGR in July 1926. It was formerly 1111. The locomotive was later transferred to Southern Portland Cement and was condemned in 1940.

Hired locomotives 5464 and 5428 at the Berrima Cement Works, 1 August 1964

The second locomotive was purchased by Southern Portland Cement from the NSWGR on 17 September 1929 and was formerly 2603. It was sold back to the NSWGR in November 1949.

The third locomotive was purchased from the NSWGR in January 1937 and was formerly 2018. This locomotive does not appear to have seen service after September 1947.

Southern Blue Metal acquired "Wonga" from Hoskins Coal & Coke Company at Wongawilli in October 1927. They used it on the quarry floor. It was withdrawn in September 1929 and scrapped in 1942.This little saddle-tank engine had a long history, being built by Andrew Barklay Sons & Co., in Kilmarnock, Scotland, and first used on the mine railway of the British and Tasmanian Charcoal Iron Company in 1876. It was sold in 1879 and served in an oil shale mine at Hartley Vale, before moving to the Wongawilli Colliery in 1916.

A number of locomotives were, from time to time, hired by the company from the NSWGR on a casual basis. These included 24 and 25 class 2-6-0s and 32 class 4-6-0s. In 1960, a 50 class 2-8-0 goods type was hired, followed in the mid-1960s by a more modern 53 class.

Two 600 hp diesel-electric locomotives were ordered in 1966 to replace the hired steam locomotives. These were obtained from A Goninan of Broadmeadow. They arrived in July 1967. Some technical difficulties were encountered, with NSWGR 48 class diesels being used on occasions during the late 1970s.

== Tin Hares ==
The Berrima line was the home of two "Tin Hares". The first entered service in the late 1920s, having been converted from a 1926-7 Chevrolet truck. It was used to convey the Medway Colliery Mine Manager and his deputy between the Cement Works and the mine. At weekends, the railcar was used by maintenance staff. The car could operate in the forward direction only. To enable the vehicle to be turned, a vertical steel bar, with an eye-bolt on the top, ran up through the cab. A gantry crane located at the colliery was used to lift and turn it at that end of the line, whilst an overhead travelling crane at the works performed the same job there.

The first car was destroyed by a head-on collision at the colliery about 1940. It was replaced by a similar vehicle, constructed from a 1938 Chevrolet. It, too, was wrecked after colliding with a steam locomotive about 1947.

== Demise ==
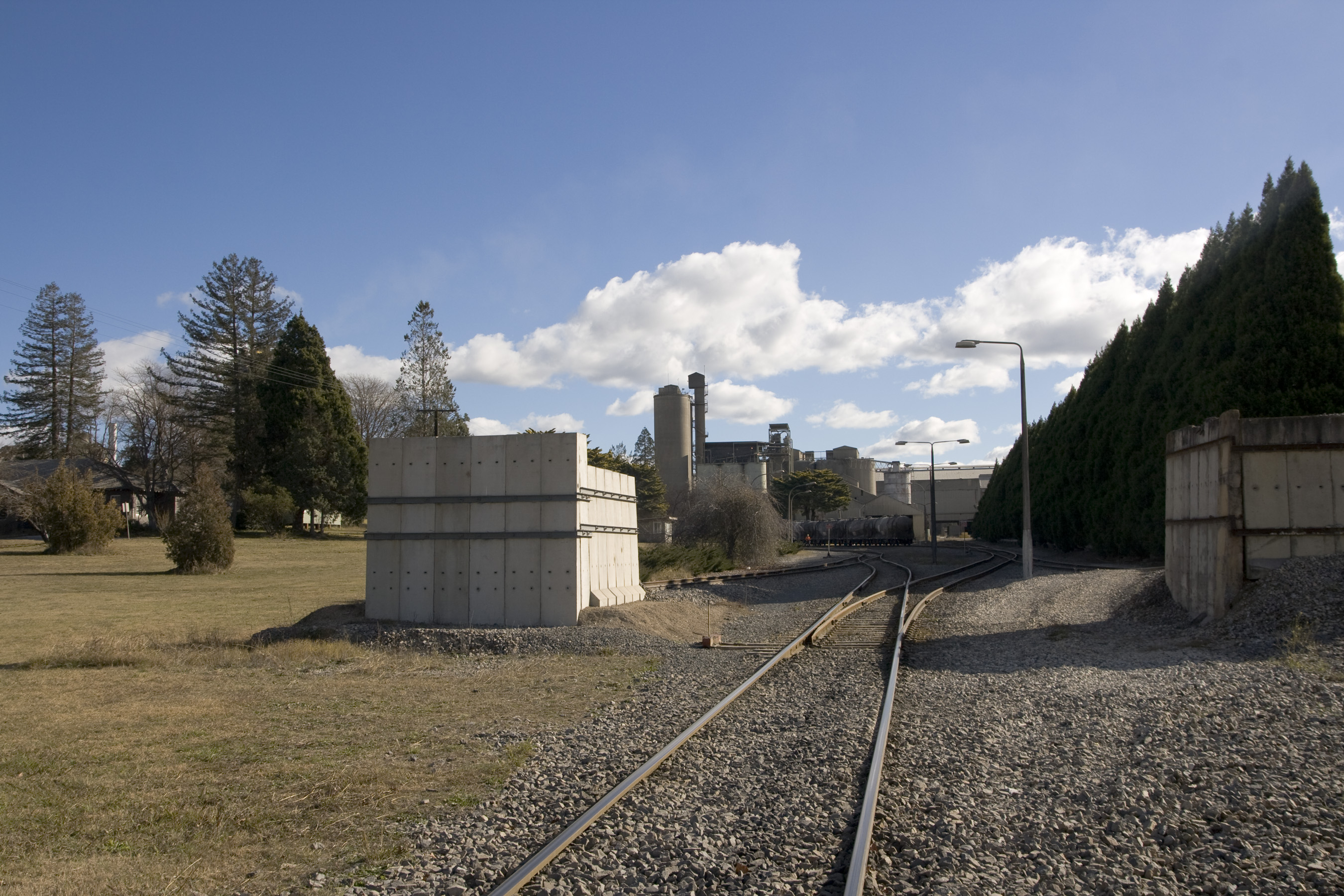
View of the cement works from the Berrima Road level crossing.

Train working to the colliery fell off in the mid-1970s in favour of road transport. No train ran to the colliery after about June 1978. The rails from the cement works to the mine, however, remained in situ for another 10 years. An opening was provided in the motorway built across the line in the late 1980s.

The line remains open from the junction to the cement works, serving that facility as well as the Ingham Chicken factory and the fertiliser works near the junction.
