= Charles Bunning =

Australian businessman

Charles R. Bunning
- Born: 1 March 1905
- Died: 3 June 1994 (aged 89)
- Occupation: retail businessman
- Known for: Bunnings
- Family: Robert Bunning (father), Arthur Bunning (uncle)

Charles R. Bunning (1 March 1905 – 3 June 1994) was a West Australian businessman who played an early significant role in the development of major retailer Bunnings.

== Biography ==
Charles was a son of Robert Bunning, an English migrant who, with his brother Arthur, formed Bunning Brothers in 1886. The firm developed into one of Australia's largest timber companies.

Charles and his brothers Joe and Tom enlarged the business after their father's death. They made bricks and during World War II joined the rival Perth group Millars at the request of the federal Ministry of Munitions. As shipbuilders, they built the small snake boats used by Z force to land on Japanese-occupied land in Asia.

Bunnings rode the post-War housing boom to become the largest logging operators in Australia. Charles was prominent in the Association of Sawmillers and Timber Merchants during the 1950s and, as president of the Employers Federation, championed the cause of greater national and international investment in West Australian industry.

Charles was instrumental in the construction of the Donnelly River Mill, south-west of Bridgetown, and the Gascoyne River Bridge, 13 km north-east of Carnarvon. Both structures are on the Heritage Council of Western Australia's register of heritage places.

In 1931 Charles married noted WA artist Elizabeth Blair Barber (1909–2001) in Melbourne, who portrayed scenes of the south-west timber industry.
