= Hardwarehouse =

Australian home improvement chain

- Formerly: BBC Hardware Home Depot
- Type: Subsidiary
- Industry: Retail
- Founded: October 3, 1992; 33 years ago
- Founder: BBC Hardware
- Defunct: 2001; 25 years ago
- Fate: Absorbed into Bunnings
- Number of locations: 62 (2001)
- Area served: Australia, New Zealand
- Products: Hardware
- Revenue: $1.5 billion (2000)
- Net income: $111 million (2000)
- Number of employees: 5,000+ (2000)
- Parent: Howard Smith Limited
- Website: www.hardwarehouse.com.au

Hardwarehouse was a home improvement chain in Australia. The chain was an offshoot of BBC Hardware, which was owned by Burns Philp and then Howard Smith Limited, and had stores in Australia and New Zealand. It was established by BBC Hardware as a way to implement and develop the adopted hardware warehouse concept which was based on overseas chains B&Q and Home Depot.

Before Hardwarehouse was absorbed into Bunnings in 2001, it was the largest corporately owned home improvement retailer in Australia and New Zealand with 62 stores and over 5,000 employees, as it traded under the BBC Hardware name.

== History ==
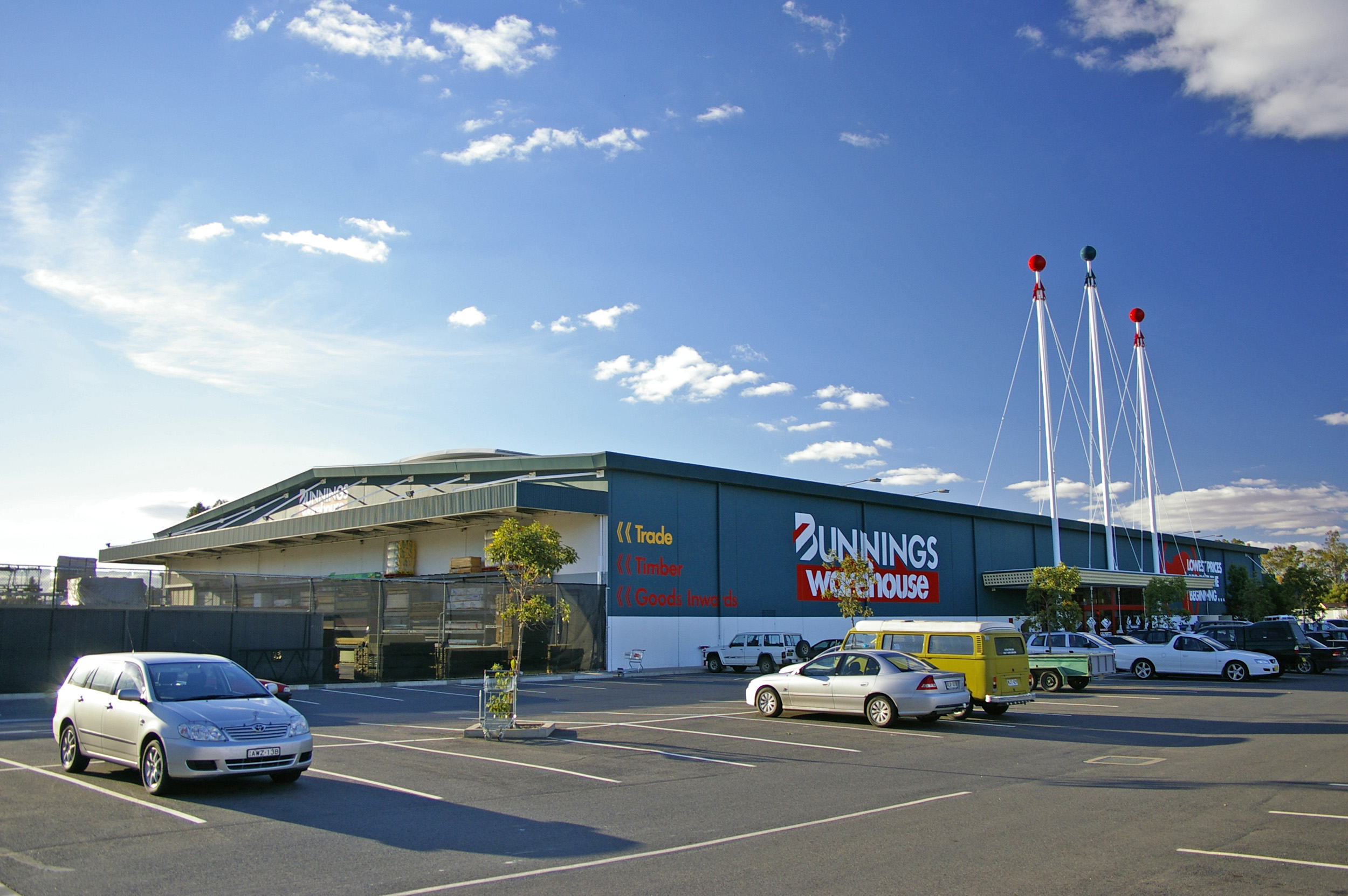
A converted Hardwarehouse store that traded as Bunnings in Wagga Wagga. The three columns topped by balls were a fixture of all Hardwarehouse stores.

The first store was opened in the Sydney suburb of Bankstown on 3 October 1992. Despite the store having a larger selling space than the ones that opened later, it proved that the introduction of this concept was successful. BBC Hardware continued market testing to further develop the concept and help it gain traction in the retail hardware market. Another store was opened at Rockdale in 1993, and two more at Thornleigh and Caringbah in 1994, to reflect the continuous market testing.

In July 1994, Howard Smith Limited bought BBC Hardware from Burns Philp and the chain was rebranded as Hardwarehouse. Subsequently, the chain expanded by opening new stores in Melbourne, Perth and Queensland. This followed with the chain's expansion into New Zealand. Since 1994, Hardwarehouse opened up to 14 stores a year. By 2001, the chain had 59 stores in Australia and three in New Zealand.

On 13 June 2001, Howard Smith Limited, owner of BBC Hardware and Hardwarehouse, was bought by Wesfarmers. The chain began its transition with the stores trading as Bunnings by the end of 2001. During the transition period, three of the acquired Hardwarehouse stores in Australia were closed, as the rest of the stores were reformatted by late 2004.

A number of former Bunnings stores that were converted Hardwarehouse stores were converted into retail bulk goods stores, or repurposed for other uses. A few other stores were demolished and rebuilt for larger Bunnings Warehouse stores or relocated to other abandoned hardware stores like Masters.

== Operations ==
There were a total of 62 Hardwarehouse stores that operated across Australia and New Zealand. In Australia, there was two stores in the Australian Capital Territory, 29 in New South Wales, 14 in Queensland, two in Tasmania, eight in Victoria and five in Western Australia.

In New Zealand, Hardwarehouse operated primarily in Auckland, with three stores across the region.

=== Australia ===
ACT: Fyshwick, Phillip

NSW: Artarmon, Ashfield, Bankstown, Bella Vista, Belrose, Blacktown, Bonnyrigg, Campbelltown, Caringbah, Coffs Harbour, Crossroads, Glendale, Kotara, Lidcombe, Lismore, Mascot, Minchinbury, North Parramatta, Penrith, Rockdale, Shellharbour, Tamworth, Thornleigh, Tuggerah, Tweed Heads, Villawood, Wagga Wagga, West Gosford, Wallsend and Wollongong

Qld: Biggera Waters, Booval, Burleigh Heads, Cairns, Capalaba, Caboolture, Everton Park, Indooroopilly, Maroochydore, Mount Gravatt, Oxley, Rockhampton, Toowoomba, Townsville and Underwood

Tas: Kings Meadows and Moonah

Vic: Bayswater, Doveton, Maribyrnong, Moorabbin, Notting Hill, Nunawading, Thomastown and Wendouree

WA: Cannington, Innaloo, Morley, O'Connor and Whitfords

=== New Zealand ===
Auckland: Burswood (Botany, New Zealand), Manukau and Rosedale
