= Rose Skinner =

Australian art dealer (1900–1979)

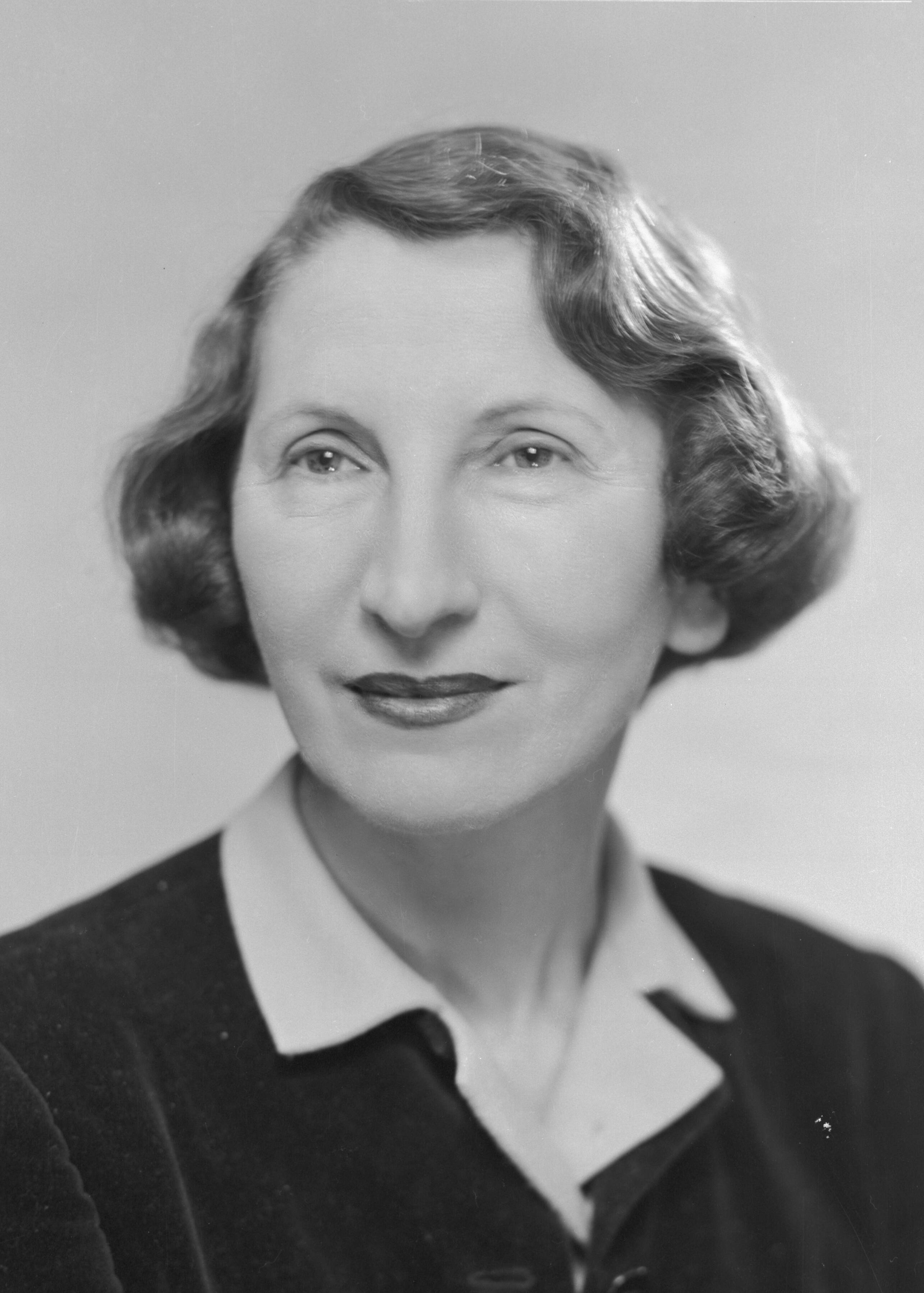
- Skinner in 1953
- Born: Rose Dvoretsky; 30 December 1900; Perth, Western Australia, Australia
- Died: 17 September 1979 (aged 78); Subiaco, Western Australia, Australia
- Known for: Art dealer, founder of Skinner Galleries
- Spouses: Herbert Varley (m. 1924; div. 1930) John Harrison (m. 1934; div. 1945) Josiah Skinner (m. 1946)
- Awards: MBE

Rose Skinner MBE (née Dvoretsky, 30 December 1900 – 17 September 1979) was an Australian art dealer. She established the Skinner Galleries in West Perth with her husband Joe Skinner, which became one of Western Australia's first successful commercial galleries.

== Personal life ==
Skinner was born on 30 December 1900 in Perth, Western Australia. She was one of five children born to Mary (née Coyle) and Samuel Dvoretsky. Her father, of Jewish descent, was born in present-day Belarus and moved to Australia in the 1890s. He purchased a farming property at Kwinana Beach and was a long-serving chairman of the Rockingham Road Board.

Skinner was educated at Methodist Ladies' College, Perth. She married businessman Herbert Varley in 1924, but was divorced in 1930. She subsequently began a relationship with John Wastell Harrison, an Australian-born tea planter in Ceylon (present-day Sri Lanka). They married in Kegalle in 1934, but she had returned to Perth by 1939, working as a censor during World War II. She was divorced again in 1945 and the following year married English-born Josiah Skinner, a builder and real estate agent who was also a collector of art and antiques. They met through the Workers' Art Guild.

After several years of ill health, Skinner died in Subiaco on 17 September 1979 at the age of 78. She was cremated with Anglican rites.

== Skinner Galleries ==
In 1955, Skinner and her husband purchased a two-storey house in West Perth which had originally been built for Edith Cowan. She persuaded her husband to build a gallery on the property, an "attractive, exposed brick and glass edifice [which] reflected his interest in contemporary architecture and design". It featured a large open space with wooden floorboards looking out onto a sculpture garden, and was one of the first purpose-built art galleries in Australia. The former site of the gallery was added to the State Register of Heritage Places in 2017.

The Skinner Galleries opened on 14 October 1958 and held 214 exhibitions until its closure in 1976, which occurred after Skinner suffered a severe stroke. She sold art on a commission basis and preferred to describe herself as an artist's agent rather than a dealer. She was an advocate for the right of artists to receive droit de suite on resales of artwork.

Skinner promoted Western Australian artists, including Robert Juniper, Brian McKay, Howard Taylor and George Haynes. She was an early supporter of the Perth Group established by Juniper, Guy Grey-Smith and others, but later fell out with Grey-Smith. She also staged exhibitions for nationally prominent artists like Sid Nolan, Arthur Boyd, Fred Williams, Albert Tucker and Hal Missingham. During the 1962 British Empire and Commonwealth Games she staged a Nolan exhibition which was opened by Prince Philip, Duke of Edinburgh. Portraits of Skinner were exhibited in the Archibald Prize by several artists. Robert Juniper entered separate portraits of Skinner in 1963, 1967, and 1969.

Skinner and the gallery were involved in several controversies relating to her exhibitors' modernist art. In 1965, a nude painting by Jon Molvig was removed and examined by detectives on obscenity grounds. In 1971, she publicly criticised the Perth City Council for its unwillingness to display Sid Nolan's paintings of Western Australian wildflowers, stating "an artist of international reputation cannot be expected to be the butt of the casual misjudgments – or is it the deep-rooted and uninstructed prejudices? – of city councillors in the world's most isolated capital".

== Legacy and honours ==
Skinner and her husband "were hugely influential as tastemakers for, and supporters of, the Australian art scene". They bequeathed the bulk of their collection to the University of Western Australia, comprising 68 works. The Lawrence Wilson Art Gallery staged an exhibition of their collection in 2007, including multiple works by Sidney Nolan, Fred Williams and Ian Fairweather.

Skinner was appointed as a Member of the Order of the British Empire (MBE) in 1972 for "services to art". She initially planned to return the honour on the grounds that she had expected an award of a higher rank, describing it as "an insult to the art medium". She subsequently decided to accept the award.

Skinner's contribution to the cultural life of Perth, as well as the efforts of fellow gallerists Rie Heymans, Elizabeth Blair Barber and Cherry Lewis, were remembered in 2026 as part of an exhibition at the North Metropolitan TAFE entitled "Pioneering Spaces: Four Women Who Shaped Perth's Art Scene".
