= Robert Bunning =

Timber merchant and sawmiller (1859–1936)

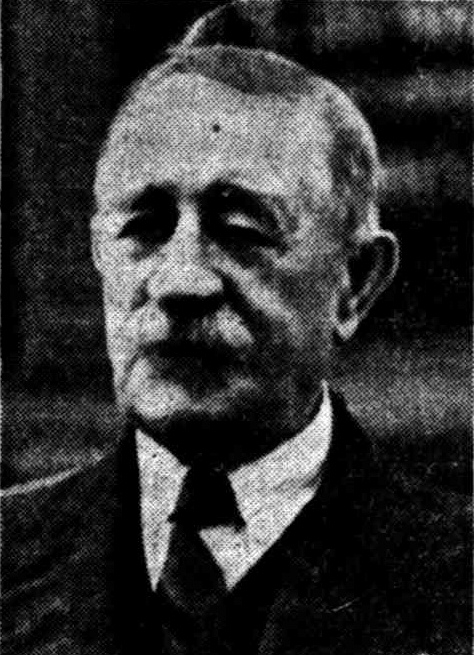
- Bunning c. 1936
- Born: 13 December 1859; Hackney, London, London, England, United Kingdom
- Died: 12 August 1936 (aged 76); Western Australia, Australia
- Known for: co-founder of Bunnings with brother Arthur Bunning
- Family: Charles Bunning (son)

Robert Bunning (13 December 1859 – 12 August 1936) was an English-born Western Australian businessman involved in the construction, timber, and sawmill industries. He co-founded with his younger brother Arthur (1863–1929) the company Bunning Bros, the predecessor to the modern-day retailer Bunnings.

== Early life ==
Bunning was born in Hackney, London, on 13 December 1859 to carpenter Joseph Bunning and his wife Jane, née Bain. Bunning became a carpenter's apprentice, travelling across London for work. The Bunning family moved to Boston, America in 1872, where Joseph Bunning found work with church buildings. The Bunnings moved back to London, though Robert and his younger brother Arthur initially stayed in Chicago for work; by the 1880s they had returned to London to help their father erect a church spire.

In 1886 the two Bunning brothers travelled to Fremantle, Colony of Western Australia on the SS Elderslie, to visit their sister and brother-in-law. They departed Gravesend on 9 May, and arrived in Fremantle on 29 June. The brothers had intended to travel on to California, but decided to stay in Australia.

== Business ==
Robert and Arthur Bunning formed a partnership business, Bunning bros Brothers, in 1886, and soon won construction contracts from the Western Australian government for expansions to Fremantle Lunatic Asylum and Roebourne's hospital. They built the Weld Club and Trinity Church in the early 1890s, as well as developing a large property portfolio, including four brickworks.

In 1896, Bunning Brothers was struggling to acquire jarrah timber due to a boom in exports. This led them to buy a timber mill in North Dandalup in 1897, and later set up sawmills across the state's South West region. Bunnings also became one of the largest exporters of railway sleepers in Western Australia.

== Other roles and personal life ==
Bunning went to Scotland in 1889, where he married Georgina Taylor on 28 August at Strathdon, close to Aberdeen. They had two children before Georgina died in 1897. Five years later, Bunning married Helen Marion MacRae in Edinburgh, in October 1902, and they had five children.

Bunning was part of the Timber Merchants and Mill Owners' Association from near its inception c. 1897. He became the association's president in 1904, a position he held until 1925, and was its representative on the executive of the Western Australian Employers' Federation from 1917 to 1936. Bunning also had a role on the executive of the Sawmillers' Association, from when it started in 1913 until 1936.

Bunning died on 12 August 1936, while at a dinner celebrating his 50 years in business in Western Australia. It was held at the Palace Hotel, attended by around 50 WA business leaders, friends, and staff. After listening to various speaker lauding him, Bunning started his reply speech, but after approximately five minutes he collapsed, and was dead by the time a doctor attending the party had rushed to his side.

A crowded funeral was held on 14 August, and Bunning was buried in the Presbyterian section of Karrakatta Cemetery's. At probate, his estate was valued at £29,220. Bunning's sons Charles, Tom and Joe, took over the family business.

== Legacy ==
Bunning's business was expanded by his sons, listed as a public company in 1952, and taken over by Wesfarmers in 1994. The business, focused on Bunnings hardware stores, became a national and international brand, with stores across Australia and New Zealand, and until 2018, the UK and Ireland.

The state's logging competition, organised by the Australia Day Sports Committee, named the 12in. standing block the Robert Bunning Memorial Cup, after Bunning.

Bunning, along with his brother and sons, was recognised as one of the most influential Western Australian businessmen in The West Australian's 2013 list of the 100 most influential.
