= Home Hardware (Australia) =

Australian hardware store chain owned by Metcash

- Industry: Home improvement/Hardware
- Founded: 1993; 33 years ago
- Headquarters: Heatherton, Victoria, Australia
- Number of locations: 189 stores
- Area served: Australia
- Key people: Annette Welsh, CEO
- Parent: Mitre 10
- Website: www.homehardware.com.au

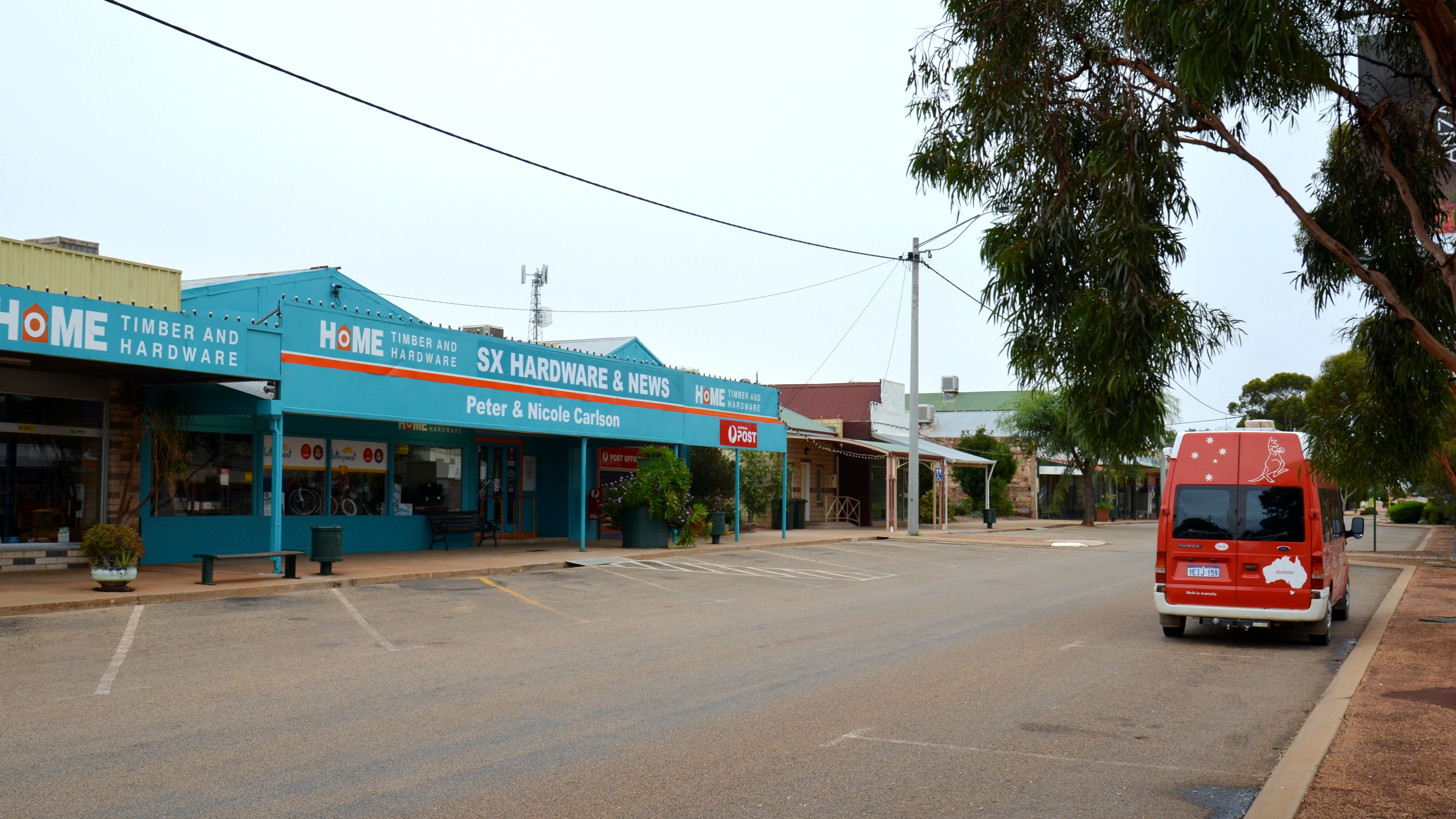
Home Hardware store on Antares Street in Southern Cross

Home Hardware (previously known as Home Timber & Hardware) is an Australian retail hardware chain. It is Australia's third-biggest hardware chain after Bunnings and Mitre 10, the latter of which is its parent company.

Stores are independently owned and operated and Home has 189 stores across Australia.

== History ==
The brand was launched in 1993 by manufacturing and wholesaler John Danks & Son following the merger of the Homestead and Homesaver brands while in South Australia, they also absorbed a few Lloyds & Banner stores. This began a long companionship with fellow Danks chain, Thrifty-Link Hardware (the companionship now known as the Independent Hardware Group). Danks was acquired by a joint venture of Woolworths Group and Lowe's in 2009.

In 2016, Home Hardware and Thrifty-Link Hardware were sold to Metcash in a $165 million deal as part of Woolworths Group's decision to drop out of the hardware industry.

== Operations ==
Home is known for its distinctive advertisements with two animated dog mascots: Rusty (voiced by Vic Plume and Ken Campbell) and Sandy (voiced by Greg Fleet), often making fun of or pointing out perceived flaws of another unnamed hardware store — usually implied to be Bunnings. Home nicknames its catalogues "dogalogues", in reference to Rusty and Sandy.

Home Hardware sells paint, general hardware, power tools and garden products to the DIY market.
