= Mitre 10 =

Australian hardware store chain operating as a retailers cooperative, owned by Metcash

Mitre 10 Australia Pty Ltd
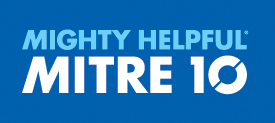
- Type: Subsidiary
- Industry: Retail/Trade Building supplies
- Genre: Hardware
- Founded: 1959; 67 years ago
- Founder: Tom Molomby; Tom Danaher; Reg Buchanan; Jack Womersley; Ian Nisbet; Bill Davey; Bill Wilson
- Headquarters: Melbourne, Victoria, Australia
- Number of locations: Over 400 (2025)
- Area served: Australia
- Key people: Scott Marshall, CEO
- Products: Timber; Hardware; Housewares; Retail/Trade Plumbing; Farm fencing products Trade Electrical supplies Hand and Power Tools; Kitchen and Bathroom; Paint; Garden and Outdoor products
- Services: Painting, Tool Sharpening, Pool Water Testing, DIY Workshops
- Revenue: ▲ A$1.06 billion (2009)
- Operating income: ▲ A$371.6 million (2009)[2]
- Number of employees: 16,500
- Parent: Metcash
- Subsidiaries: Design 10; Home Hardware (Australia); Plants Plus; Thrifty-Link Hardware
- Website: www.mitre10.com.au

Mitre 10 is an Australian retail and trade hardware store chain. Operations are based on a cooperative system, where the store owners are members of the National group. The chain name references the mitre joint. There are over 400 Mitre 10 locations throughout Australia.

== History ==
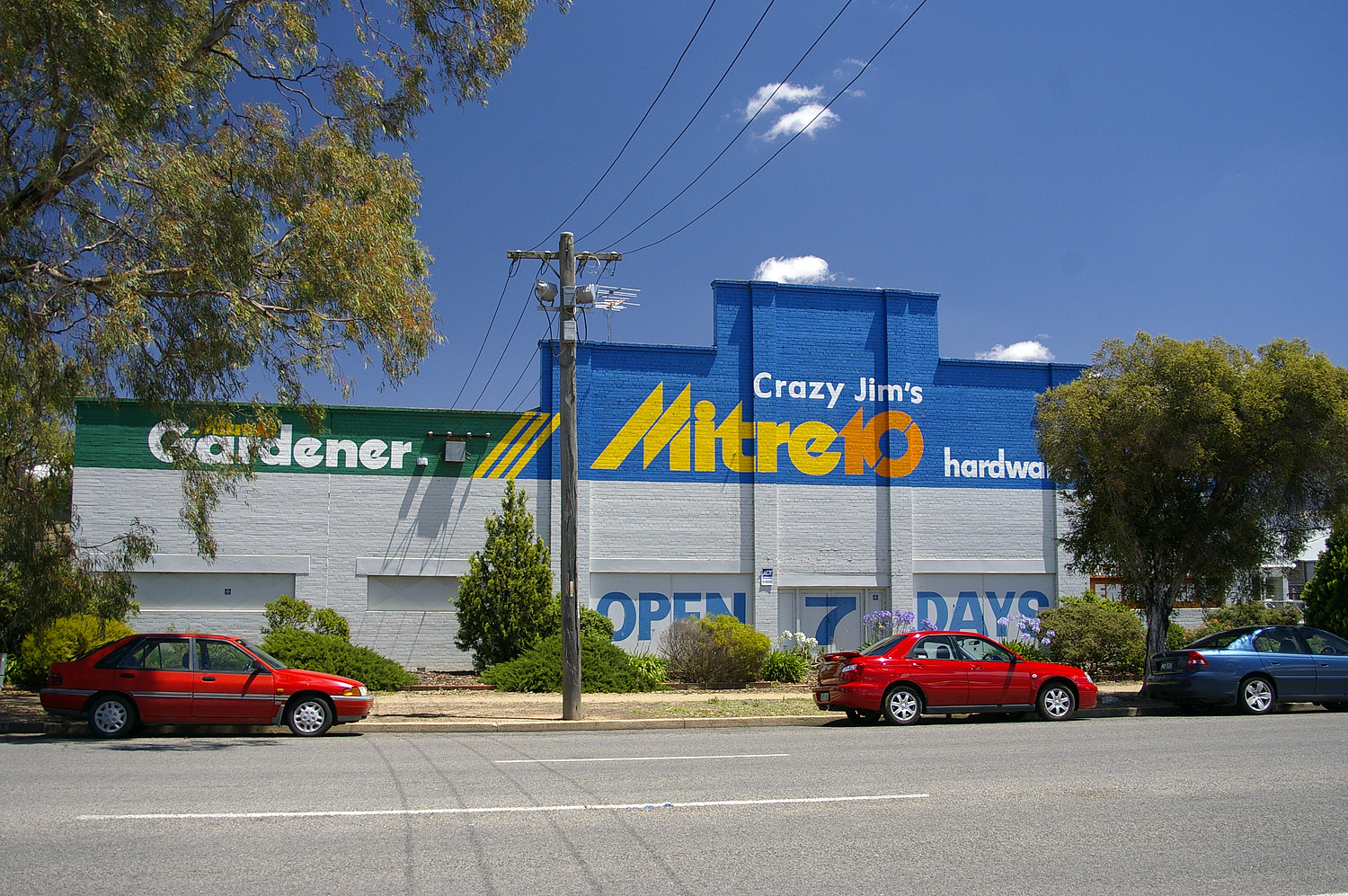
Mitre 10 Solutions store with the older Mitre 10 logo in Wagga Wagga

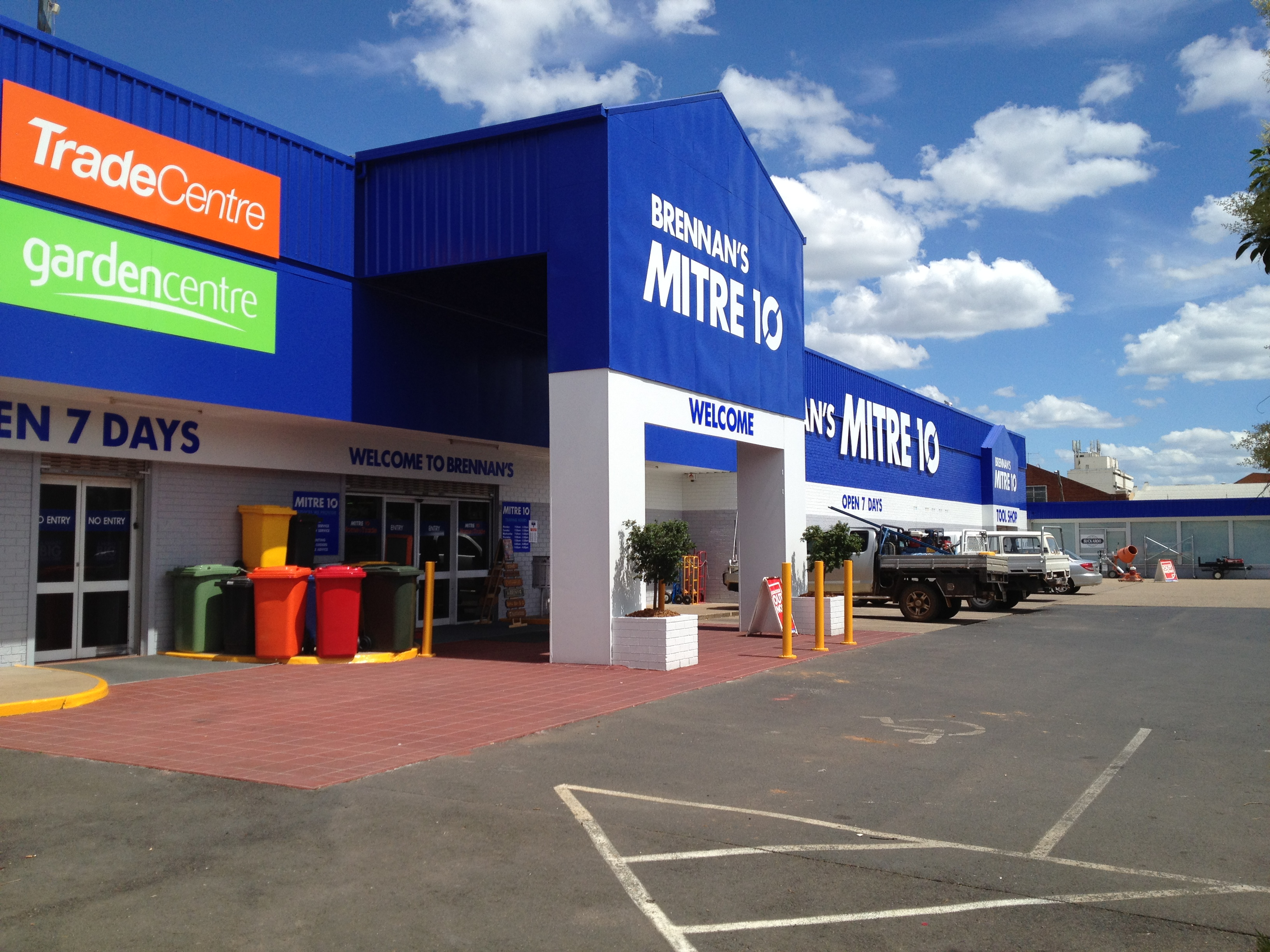
Mitre 10 store with the current Mitre 10 branding in Dubbo

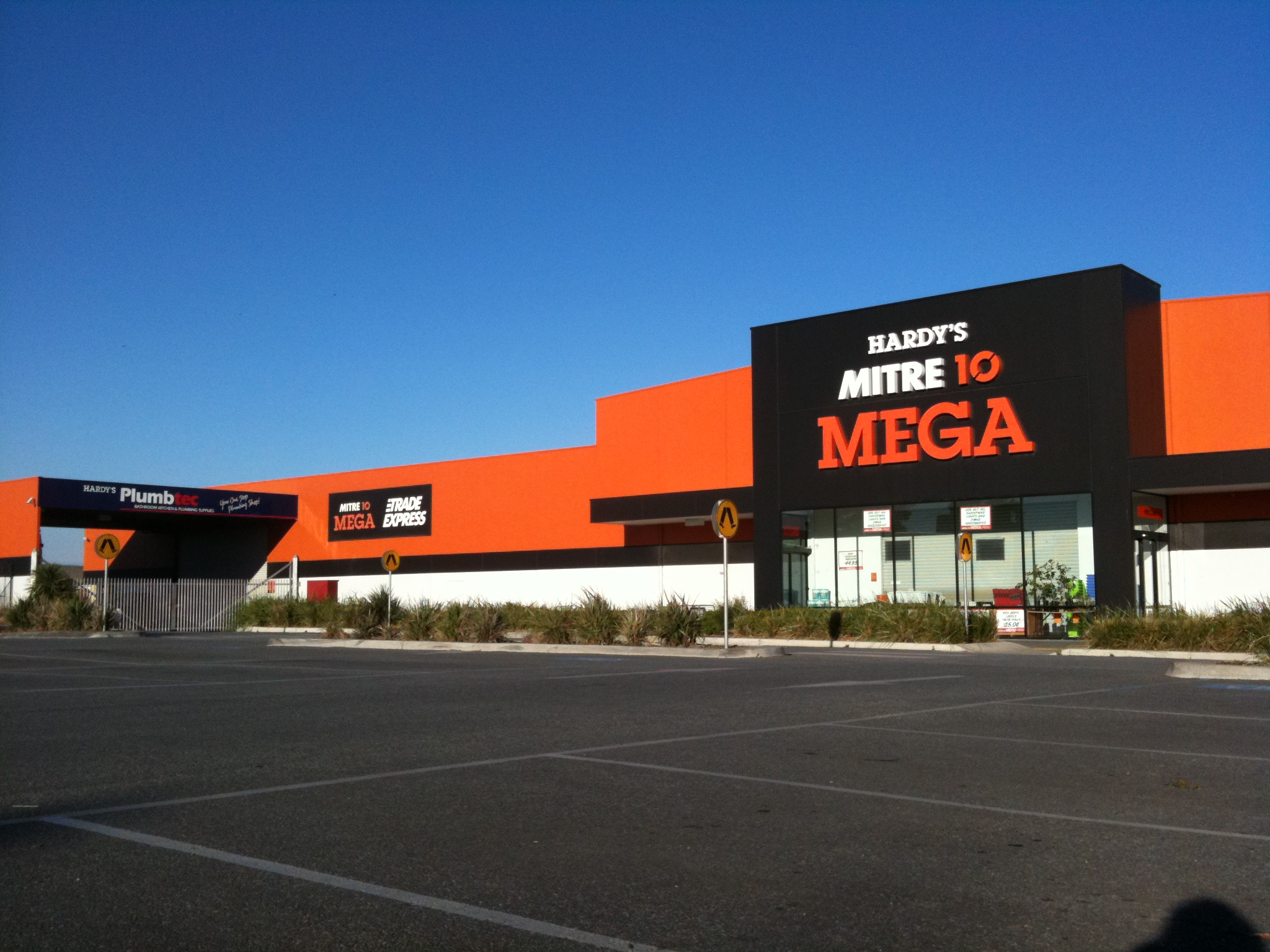
Mitre 10 Mega and Trade Centre Pakenham

The move to set up a co-operative group of hardware stores originated from a meeting of seven men who would become Mitre 10's founders – Tom Molomby, Tom Danaher, Reg Buchanan, Jack Womersley, Ian Nisbet, Bill Davey and Bill Wilson – held at Buchanan's home in Balwyn, Victoria, on 29 June 1959. This move occurred specifically to maximise funds and energy with regards to advertising and promotions and to demonstrate that independent operators offered service, advice and competitive prices.

The new company soon expanded operations, with fifteen New South Wales members joining the group by February 1961. Queensland soon followed with seven retailers, under the chairmanship of Arthur Scurr, joining the cooperative in January 1962, followed by a further 16 members from Newcastle in October the same year. With the company successfully operational in the three Eastern states of Australia by the end of 1962, South Australia and Western Australia soon started running their own state-based co-operatives, and attention turned to Tasmania.

In June 2004 Mitre 10 Australia opened its first "destination hardware" or "big-box" chain at Beenleigh, Queensland.

In late 2008 Woolworths and Mitre 10 Australia held talks on the potential acquisition of the company. The Australian Financial Review reported that Mitre 10 Australia had held talks with other companies since beginning to find a major buyer or investor, although in early 2009 Woolworths decided the company structure was too complex for a takeover. Mitre 10 Australia was believed to be in talks with Metcash. UBS analysts said Metcash had been on lookout for a "fourth pillar" for some time to add to its operations, and that Mitre 10 might be perfect.

In late 2009 Mitre 10 Australia announced that they were searching for a major investment or buyer. In November 2009, Metcash released a statement to the Australian Securities Exchange with a proposal for Metcash to take 50.1% in the Mitre 10 Hardware Group for A$55 million cash injection. The deal proposed giving Metcash the right to buy the remaining 49.9% in the company at the end of 2012 or 2013. In March 2010 98% of Mitre 10 Australia shareholders voted in favour of the Metcash bid. Metcash acquired the rest of Mitre 10 in 2012.

== Store types ==
Mitre 10 is a "destination hardware," or "big-box," chain; designed as a one stop shop for big projects. The main focus is customer service and stores have customer service attendants stationed in different departments of the store i.e., plumbing, electrical, trade building supplies (including timber), paint, the majority of these have a trade qualification. Mitre 10 Australia opened its first Mega in June 2004 at Beenleigh, Queensland.

Mitre 10 stores are painted in the traditional blue and white livery. As Mitre 10 stores are all privately owned, operators have the option of adding concepts to their store, such as a dedicated "GardenCentre" or "TradeCentre".

== Sponsorships ==
From 1995 until 2000, Mitre 10 was naming rights sponsor of Larkham Motorsport.
