= Medway Quarry railway line =

Private railway line in New South Wales, Australia

The Medway Quarry railway line is a private railway line in New South Wales, Australia, owned by Blue Circle Southern Cement Company. It is a short branch from the Main South line serving the Medway limestone quarry. The junction for the line, Medway Junction, lies between Tallong and Marulan railway stations.

== See also ==
- Rail transport in New South Wales
